This is a list of women who have made noteworthy contributions to or achievements in mathematics. These include mathematical research, mathematics education, the history and philosophy of mathematics, public outreach, and mathematics contests.

A

 Karen Aardal (born 1961), Norwegian and Dutch applied mathematician, theoretical computer scientist, and operations researcher
 Hanan Mohamed Abdelrahman, Egyptian and Norwegian mathematics educator
 Izabela Abramowicz (1889–1973), Polish mathematician and mathematics educator
 Louise Doris Adams (1889–1965), British mathematics reformer, president of the Mathematical Association
 Rachel Blodgett Adams (1894–1982), American mathematician, one of the earliest mathematics doctorates from Radcliffe College
 Tatyana Afanasyeva (1876–1964), Russian-Dutch researcher in statistical mechanics, randomness, and geometry education
 Amandine Aftalion (born 1973), French applied mathematician, studies superfluids and the mathematics of footracing
 Maria Gaetana Agnesi (1718–1799), Italian mathematician and philosopher, possibly the first female mathematics professor
 Ilka Agricola (born 1973), German expert on differential geometry and its applications in mathematical physics
 Nkechi Agwu (born 1962), African American ethnomathematician
 Dorit Aharonov (born 1970), Israeli specialist in quantum computing
 Beatrice Aitchison (1908–1997), American topologist who became a transportation economist in the US civil service
 Noreen Sher Akbar, Pakistani fluid dynamicist
 Shabnam Akhtari, Iranian number theorist
 Asuman Aksoy, Turkish-American functional analyst
 Meike Akveld, Swiss knot theorist and mathematics educator
 Fatiha Alabau (born 1961), French expert in control of partial differential equations, president of French applied mathematics society
 Mara Alagic, Serbian mathematics educator, editor-in-chief of Journal of Mathematics and the Arts
 Lara Alcock, British mathematics educator and author
 Helen Popova Alderson (1924–1972), Russian and British mathematician and translator, wrote on quasigroups and reciprocity laws
 Grace Alele-Williams (1932–2022), first woman to lead a Nigerian university
 Aldona Aleškevičienė-Statulevičienė (1936–2017), Lithuanian probability theorist
 Stephanie B. Alexander, American differential geometer
 Florence Eliza Allen (1876–1960), second female and fourth overall mathematics PhD from the University of Wisconsin
 Linda J. S. Allen, American mathematician and mathematical biologist
 Elizabeth S. Allman (born 1965), American mathematical biologist
 Ann S. Almgren, American applied mathematician who works on computational simulations of supernovae and white dwarfs
 Melania Alvarez, Mexican-Canadian mathematics educator, organizer of summer mathematics camps for indigenous students
 Yvette Amice (1936–1993), French expert on p-adic analysis who became president of the French mathematical society
 Divsha Amirà (1899–1966), Israeli geometer and mathematics educator
 T. A. Sarasvati Amma (1918–2000), Historian of ancient Indian mathematics
 Astrid an Huef, New Zealand expert on functional analysis, president of New Zealand Mathematical Society
 Nalini Anantharaman (born 1976), French mathematical physicist, winner of the Henri Poincaré Prize
 Beverly Anderson (born 1943), American mathematician, director of minority programs for Mathematical Sciences Education Board
 Kirsti Andersen (born 1941), Danish historian of mathematics
 Cabiria Andreian Cazacu (1928–2018), Romanian complex analyst
 Hajnal Andréka (born 1947), Hungarian researcher in algebraic logic
 Annie Dale Biddle Andrews (1885–1940), algebraic geometer, first female PhD from the University of California, Berkeley
 Grace Andrews (mathematician) (1869–1951), one of only two women listed in the first edition of American Men of Science
 Guacolda Antoine Lazzerini (1908–2015), Chilean mathematician and mathematics educator
 Kathleen Antonelli (1921–2006), Irish-American programmer of ENIAC, the first general-purpose electronic digital computer
 Paola Antonietti (born 1980), Italian numerical analyst, applies domain decomposition methods to geophysical simulation
 Noriko H. Arai (born 1962), Japanese mathematical logician and artificial intelligence researcher
 Crista Arangala, American numerical analyst, textbook author, and international educator
 Carolina Araujo, Brazilian algebraic geometer
 Gabriela Araujo-Pardo, Mexican graph theorist, president of Mexican Mathematical Society
 Maria Angela Ardinghelli (1730–1825), Italian translator of Stephen Hales, mathematician, physicist and noble
 Esther Arkin, Israeli-American researcher in operations research and computational geometry
 Sandra Arlinghaus, founder of the Institute of Mathematical Geography
 Fuensanta Aroca, Spanish-Mexican tropical geometer
 Marie-Claude Arnaud, French expert in dynamical systems
 Elayne Arrington, American aerospace engineer, expert on Soviet aircraft
 Sharon Arroyo, American operations researcher in aircraft manufacture
 Michèle Artigue (born 1946), French expert in mathematics education
 Natascha Artin Brunswick (1909–2003), German-American mathematician, photographer, and journal editor
 Shiri Artstein (born 1978), Israeli mathematician specializing in convex geometry and asymptotic geometric analysis
 Marcia Ascher (1935–2013), American ethnomathematician
 Winifred Asprey (1917–2007), helped establish the first computer science lab at Vassar
 Michèle Audin (born 1954), French researcher in symplectic geometry
 Bonnie Averbach (1933–2019), American mathematics and actuarial educator and author
 Tamara Awerbuch-Friedlander, American biomathematician and public health scientist
 Hertha Ayrton (1854–1923), English engineer, mathematician, physicist, and inventor, winner of the Hughes Medal

B

 Ellen Baake (born 1961), German mathematical biologist
 Wealthy Babcock (1895–1990), American mathematician, namesake of Kansas University mathematics library
 Christine Bachoc (born 1964), French expert on coding theory and kissing numbers
 Clara Latimer Bacon (1866–1948), first woman to earn a Ph.D. in mathematics from Johns Hopkins University
 Jenny Baglivo (born 1948), American mathematician, statistician, and book author
 Hajer Bahouri (born 1958), Franco-Tunisian mathematician interested in partial differential equations
 Ann E. Bailie (born 1935), American mathematician and space scientist, discovered that the earth is pear-shaped
 Frances Ellen Baker (1902–1995), American mathematician and number theorist
 Kitty Baker (1912–2014), American mathematics educator, artist and weaver, and author
 Rose Baker, British physicist, mathematician, and statistician
 Ruth Baker, British mathematical biologist interested in pattern formation and morphogenesis
 Viviane Baladi (born 1963), Swiss-French expert on dynamical systems
 Jennifer Balakrishnan, American number theorist who solved the "cursed curve"
 Deborah Loewenberg Ball, American mathematics education researcher
 Catherine Bandle (born 1943), Swiss expert on differential equations and isoperimetric inequalities
 Selenne Bañuelos (born 1985), Mexican-American mathematician and mathematical biologist
 Hélène Barcelo (born 1954), mathematician from Québec, former editor-in-chief of Journal of Combinatorial Theory, Series A
 Grace Marie Bareis (1875–1962), American group theorist, first mathematics Ph.D. at Ohio State, and founding member of the MAA
 Nina Bari (1901–1961), Soviet mathematician known for her work on trigonometric series
 Ruth Aaronson Bari (1917–2005), American mathematician known for her work in graph theory and homomorphisms
 Mildred Barnard (1908–2000), Australian biometrician, mathematician and statistician
 Janet Barnett, American mathematician known for integrating the history of mathematics into her teaching
 Ida Barney (1886–1982), American mathematics professor and astronomer
 Charlotte Barnum (1860–1934), mathematician and social activist, first female mathematics PhD from Yale
 Margaret Baron (1915–1996), British mathematics educator and historian of mathematics
 Lida Barrett (1927–2021), second female president of the MAA
 June Barrow-Green (born 1953), British historian of mathematics
 Jean Bartik (1924–2011), one of the original programmers for the ENIAC computer
 Estelle Basor (born 1947), American mathematician interested in operator theory and the theory of random matrices
 Marjorie Batchelor, American mathematician known for Batchelor's theorem on supermanifolds
 Grace Bates (1914–1996), one of few women in the United States to be granted a PhD in mathematics in the 1940s
 Lynn Batten (born 1948), Canadian immigrant to Australia, researcher in finite geometries and cryptography
 Helga Baum (born 1954), German differential geometer
 Patricia E. Bauman, studies the mathematics of liquid crystals and superconductors
 Karin Baur, Swiss combinatorial representation theorist
 Agnes Sime Baxter (1870–1917), second Canadian and fourth North American woman to earn a mathematics PhD
 Margaret Bayer, American mathematician working in polyhedral combinatorics
 Pilar Bayer (born 1946), Spanish number theorist
 Eva Bayer-Fluckiger (born 1951), Hungarian-Swiss mathematician, proved Serre's conjecture on Galois cohomology of classical groups
 Jillian Beardwood (1934–2019), British mathematician, contributed to the traveling salesperson problem
 Karine Beauchard (born 1978), French control theorist
 Miriam Becker (1909–2000), American mathematician whose career became a test case for unionization and academic tenure
 Astrid Beckmann (born 1957), German mathematician, mathematics educator, physicist, and academic administrator
 May Beenken (1901–1988), American mathematician
 Janet Beery, American mathematician and historian of mathematics
 Mary Beisiegel, American mathematics educator
 Marion Beiter (1907–1982), American mathematician, expert on cyclotomic polynomials
 sarah-marie belcastro, American algebraic geometer, editor of books on mathematics and fiber arts
 Hélène Bellosta (1946–2011), French historian of mathematics in medieval Islam
 Alexandra Bellow (born 1935), Romanian researcher in ergodic theory, probability and analysis
 Margherita Piazzola Beloch (1879–1976), Italian researcher in algebraic geometry, algebraic topology and photogrammetry
 Suzan Rose Benedict (1873–1942), first woman to earn a PhD from the University of Michigan
 Georgia Benkart (1947–2022), American mathematician, expert on Lie algebras
 Alona Ben-Tal, Israeli and New Zealand applied mathematician, models human and bird breathing
 Deborah J. Bennett (born 1950), American mathematics educator and popular mathematics book author
 Sylvie Benzoni (born 1967), French expert in fluid dynamics and partial differential equations, director of the Institut Henri Poincaré
 Bonnie Berger, American mathematician and computer scientist, researcher in computational molecular biology
 Marsha Berger (born 1953), American researcher in numerical analysis, computational fluid dynamics, and parallel computing
 Tanja Bergkvist (born 1974), Swedish mathematician and anti-feminist activist
 Julie Bergner, American expert on algebraic topology, homotopy theory, and higher category theory
 Nicole Berline (born 1944), French researcher on index theory of elliptic differential operators
 Natalia Berloff, professor of applied mathematics at the University of Cambridge
 Leah Berman (born 1976), American discrete geometer
 Christine Bernardi (1955–2018), French expert on numerical analysis of partial differential equations
 Dorothy Lewis Bernstein (1914–1988), applied mathematician, first female president of the MAA
 Inga Berre (born 1978), Norwegian applied mathematician, models porous media and geothermal systems
 Valérie Berthé (born 1968), French researcher in symbolic dynamics, combinatorics on words, and discrete geometry
 Andrea Bertozzi (born 1965), American researcher in partial differential equations, studies mathematics of urban crime
 Nadine Bezuk, American mathematics educator, president and executive director of Association of Mathematics Teacher Educators
 Vasanti N. Bhat-Nayak (1938–2009), professor of combinatorics and head of mathematics at the University of Mumbai
 Ushadevi Bhosle (born 1949), Indian expert on vector bundles
 Francesca Biagini (born 1973), Italian-German probability theorist and financial mathematician
 Ginestra Bianconi, Italian network scientist
 Lydia Bieri (born 1972), Swiss-American expert on general relativity, gravity waves, and the history of cosmology
 Anna Maria Bigatti, Italian algebraist, developer of CoCoA
 Miggy Biller, British mathematician and mathematics educator
 Sara Billey (born 1968), American algebraic combinatorialist
 Katalin Bimbó (born 1963), Canadian mathematical logician and proof theorist
 Christina Birkenhake (born 1961), German algebraic geometer
 Joan Birman (born 1927), American braid and knot theorist
 Laure Blanc-Féraud (born 1963), French applied mathematician and image processing researcher
 Gertrude Blanch (1897–1996), American numerical analyst
 Roswitha Blind, German convex geometer and politician
 Karen M. Bliss, American applied mathematician specializing in biomedical applications and materials science
 Lenore Blum (born 1942), distinguished professor of computer science at Carnegie Mellon University
 Jo Boaler (born 1964), British-American promoter of mathematics education reform and equitable mathematics classrooms
 Mary L. Boas (1917–2010), author of Mathematical Methods in the Physical Sciences
 Christine Böckmann (born 1955), German numerical analyst, expert in atmospheric lidar
 Graciela Boente, Argentine mathematical statistician known for her research in robust statistics
 Neda Bokan (born 1947), Serbian differential geometer
 Natashia Boland (born 1967), Australian mathematician and operations researcher
 Sylvie Boldo, French expert in formal verification of numerical computation
 Aline Bonami, French mathematical analyst, president of the Société mathématique de France
 Petra Bonfert-Taylor, German-American complex analyst and engineering educator
 Virginie Bonnaillie-Noël (born 1976), French numerical analyst
 Alicia Boole Stott (1860–1940), Irish-English four-dimensional geometer
 Mary Everest Boole (1832–1916), self-taught author of didactic works on mathematics
 Kathleen Booth (1922–2022), British mathematician and pioneer of assembly language computer programming
 Liliana Borcea, Romanian-American applied mathematician, expert on wave propagation
 Valentina Borok (1931–2004), Soviet Ukrainian mathematician who studied partial differential equations
 Celia Grillo Borromeo (1684–1777), Genovese mathematician and scientist, discovered Clélie curve
 Liouba Bortniker (1860 – after 1903), Russian-French mathematician, first woman agrégée in mathematics, first winner of Peccot prize
 Fernanda Botelho (born 1957), Portuguese-American functional analyst
 Mary Michel Boulus (1926–2012), American Catholic nun, mathematics teacher, and college president
 Anne Bourlioux, Canadian expert in turbulent combustion and world record holder in indoor rowing
 Élisabeth Bouscaren (born 1956), French mathematician who studies the connections between algebraic geometry and model theory
 Mireille Bousquet-Mélou (born 1967), French combinatorialist
 Anne Boutet de Monvel (born 1948), French applied mathematician and mathematical physicist
 Debra Boutin, American mathematician, expert on the symmetries of graphs
 Sylvia Bozeman (born 1947), African-American mathematician and academic administrator
 Lis Brack-Bernsen (born 1946), Danish and Swiss mathematician, historian of science, and historian of mathematics
 Mary Bradburn (1923–2000), British mathematics educator, president of the Mathematical Association
 Elizabeth Bradley (born 1961), American expert in nonlinear dynamical systems, competed in 1988 Olympics
 Lillian K. Bradley (1921–1995), first African-American woman to earn a doctorate in any subject at the University of Texas
 Dorothy Brady (1903–1977), American mathematician and economist
 Priscilla Braislin (1838–1888), first professor of mathematics at Vassar College
 Leila Bram (1927–1979), head of mathematics for Office of Naval Research
 Leticia Brambila Paz (born 1953), Mexican algebraic geometer
 Bodil Branner (born 1943), founder of European Women in Mathematics, chair of the Danish Mathematical Society
 Hel Braun (1914–1986), German number theorist
 Elena Braverman, Russian, Israeli, and Canadian researcher in delay differential equations and difference equations
 Loretta Braxton (1934–2019), American mathematician
 Marilyn Breen (born 1944), American geometer
 Tara E. Brendle, American low-dimensional topologist and combinatorial group theorist
 Susanne Brenner, expert in the numerical solution of differential equations
 Sonja Brentjes (born 1951), German historian of Islamic mathematics and cartography
 Diane Briars (born 1951), American mathematics educator, advocate for education reform, president of National Council of Teachers of Mathematics
 Kathrin Bringmann (born 1977), German number theorist, expert on mock theta functions, winner of SASTRA Ramanujan Prize
 Ruth Britto, American mathematical physicist
 Jill Britton (1944–2016), Canadian mathematics educator, author of educational books on mathematics
 Bárbara M. Brizuela, American researcher on mathematics education in early childhood and elementary school
 Anne Broadbent, Canadian researcher on quantum computing, quantum cryptography, and quantum information
 Tamara Broderick, American mathematician and computer scientist who works in machine learning and Bayesian inference
 Lia Bronsard (born 1963), Canadian expert on interface dynamics, president of Canadian Mathematical Society
 Margaret Brown, British mathematics educator
 Susan Brown (1937–2017), English fluid mechanics researcher, possibly second female mathematics professor in UK
 Marjorie Lee Browne (1914–1979), one of the first African-American women to receive a doctorate in mathematics
 Laurence Broze (born 1960), Belgian applied mathematician, statistician, and economist, president of l'association femmes et mathématiques
 Karen Brucks (1957–2017), American mathematician, expert on one-dimensional dynamical systems
 Maria Bruna (born 1984), Spanish applied mathematician known for stochastic modelling of multiscale phenomena
 Sophie Bryant (1850–1922), Anglo-Irish mathematician, educator, feminist and activist
 Ranee Brylinski (born 1957), American mathematician known for her research in representation theory and quantum logic gates
 Evelyn Buckwar, German-Austrian expert on stochastic differential equations
 Alina Bucur, American analytic number theorist and arithmetic statistician
 Lilya Budaghyan, Armenian-Norwegian cryptographer
 Annalisa Buffa (born 1973), Italian specialist in numerical analysis for partial differential equations
 Marta Bunge, Argentine-Canadian category theorist
 Angelika Bunse-Gerstner (born 1951), German expert on numerical linear algebra
 Regina S. Burachik, Argentine-Australian researcher in convex analysis, functional analysis and non-smooth analysis
 Marilyn Burns (born 1941), American mathematics educator and author of children's books on mathematics
 Ellen Burrell (1850–1938), American mathematician
 Gail F. Burrill, American mathematics educator, president of National Council of Teachers of Mathematics
 Leone Burton (1936–2007), British researcher in ethnomathematics, founded book series on women in mathematics
 Edith Bush (1882–1977), American mathematician, first female engineering professor at Tufts University
 Ida Busbridge (1908–1988), studied integral equations and radiative transfer, first female mathematics fellow at Oxford
 Marjorie V. Butcher (1925–2016), American actuarial mathematician, first woman mathematics instructor at Michigan, first woman professor at Trinity College Connecticut
 Lynne Butler (born 1955), American combinatorialist and mathematical statistician
 Margaret K. Butler (1924–2013), computer programmer, director of the National Energy Software Center at Argonne
 Helen Byrne, British applied mathematician and mathematical biologist

C

 María Emilia Caballero, Mexican probability theorist
 Angelina Cabras (1898–1993), Italian mathematician, physicist, and theoretical mechanics professor
 Fioralba Cakoni, Albanian expert on inverse scattering theory
 Maria-Carme Calderer, Spanish-American researcher in applied mathematics
 Nora Calderwood (1896–1985), Scottish mathematician, namesake of Birmingham University's Calderwood Prize
 Daniela Calvetti, Italian-American mathematician whose work connects Bayesian statistics with numerical analysis
 Erika Tatiana Camacho (born 1974), Mexican-American mathematical biologist
 Lucy Campbell, geophysical fluid dynamics researcher from Barbados, Jamaica, Ghana, and Canada
 Jessie Forbes Cameron (1883–1968), British mathematician, first woman to complete her PhD in mathematics at the University of Marburg  
 Naiomi Cameron, American combinatorist, vice president of National Association of Mathematicians
 Patricia Campbell, American mathematics educator
 María Antònia Canals (1930–2022), Spanish mathematics educator and recreational mathematician
 Sunčica Čanić, Croatian-American expert in modeling the cardiovascular system and devices for treating it
 Ana Cannas da Silva (born 1968), Portuguese mathematician specializing in symplectic geometry and geometric topology
 Barbara Canright (1920–1997), American human computer at the Jet Propulsion Laboratory
 Yaiza Canzani, Spanish and Uruguayan mathematical analysis, known for work in spectral geometry and microlocal analysis
 Mireille Capitaine, French researcher on random matrices and free probability theory
 Lucia Caporaso, Italian algebraic geometer
 Marian Palmer Capps (1901–2001), American mathematician and leader of prominent African-American women's societies
 Ana Caraiani, Romanian-American IMO medalist, Putnam fellow, expert in algebraic number theory and the Langlands program
 Olivia Caramello (born 1984), Italian topos theorist
 Alessandra Carbone, Italian mathematician and computer scientist, studies protein interactions in muscular dystrophy
 Sally Elizabeth Carlson (1896–2000), first woman to obtain a doctorate in mathematics at the University of Minnesota
 Anna Cartan (1878–1923), French mathematician, teacher and textbook author, student of Marie Curie
 Coralia Cartis, Romanian expert on compressed sensing, numerical analysis, and regularization methods in optimization
 Mary Cartwright (1900–1998), British mathematician, one of the first to analyze a dynamical system with chaos
 María Andrea Casamayor (1700–1780), only 18th-century Spanish scientist whose work is still extant
 Bettye Anne Case, American mathematician and historian of mathematics
 Emma Castelnuovo (1913–2014), Italian mathematics educator and textbook author
 Catherine Cavagnaro (born 1965), American low-dimensional topologist and aerobatic aviator
 Beatrice Mabel Cave-Browne-Cave (1874–1947), English pioneer in the mathematics of aeronautics
 Frances Cave-Browne-Cave (1876–1965), English mathematician and computer, taught at Girton College, Cambridge
 Anny Cazenave (born 1944), French space geodesist, pioneer in satellite altimetry
 Zoia Ceaușescu (1949–2006), Romanian functional analyst, daughter of Communist leader
 Elena Celledoni (born 1967), Italian-Norwegian expert on numerical analysis, Lie groups, and structure-preserving algorithms
 Sue Chandler, author of English secondary-school mathematics textbooks
 Melody Chan, American expert in combinatorial commutative algebra, graph theory, and tropical geometry
 Sun-Yung Alice Chang (born 1948), Chinese-American mathematical analyst, member of National Academy of Sciences
 Josephine Chanler (1906–1992), American mathematician
 Mei-Chu Chang, Taiwanese-American expert in algebraic geometry and combinatorial number theory
 Vyjayanthi Chari (born 1958), Indian-American expert in quantum algebra
 Ruth Charney (born 1950), American expert on geometric group theory and Artin groups, president of the Association for Women in Mathematics (AWM)
 Marie Charpentier (1903–1994), first woman to earn a doctorate in pure mathematics in France and second to obtain a faculty position there
 Émilie du Châtelet (1706–1749), French translator and commentator of Isaac Newton's Principia Mathematica
 Indira Chatterji (born 1973), Swiss-Indian low-dimensional geometer
 Zoé Chatzidakis, French researcher in model theory and differential algebra
 Madeleine Chaumont (1896–1973), French mathematician, one of first women at École normale supérieure
 Jennifer Tour Chayes (born 1956), expert on phase transitions in networks, founder of the theory group at Microsoft Research
 Karine Chemla (born 1958), French historian of Chinese mathematics
 Jacqueline Chen, American applied mathematician and mechanical engineer, applies massively parallel computing to simulate combustion
 Xiaojun Chen, Chinese applied mathematician, expert on nonconvex optimization
 Margaret Cheney (born 1955), American expert on inverse problems
 Leslie Cheng, American harmonic analyst
 Maggie Cheng, Chinese-American applied mathematician, computer scientist, and network scientist
 Miranda Cheng (born 1979), Taiwanese-Dutch mathematician and theoretical physicist, formulated umbral moonshine
 Eugenia Cheng, English category theorist and pianist, uses analogies with food and baking to teach mathematics to non-mathematicians
 Amanda Chetwynd, British combinatorist and spatial statistician
 Elaine Chew, Singaporean-American expert in the mathematics and visualization of concepts in music theory
 Tanya Christiansen, American expert on scattering theory and partial differential equations
 Graciela Chichilnisky (born 1944), Argentine-American mathematical economist and authority on climate change
 Phyllis Chinn (born 1941), American graph theorist and historian of mathematics
 Grace Chisholm Young (1868–1944), English mathematician, first woman to receive a German doctorate
 YoungJu Choie (born 1959), Korean number theorist
 Yvonne Choquet-Bruhat (born 1923), French mathematician and physicist, first woman elected to the French Academy
 Maria Chudnovsky (born 1977), Israeli-American graph theorist, MacArthur Fellow
 Fan Chung (born 1949), Taiwanese-American researcher in random graphs
 Julia Chuzhoy, Israeli expert in approximation algorithms and graph minor theory
 Monique Chyba, applied control theory to autonomous underwater vehicles
 Agata Ciabattoni, Italian non-classical mathematical logician
 Maria Cibrario (1905–1992), Italian specialist in partial differential equations
 Marta Civil, American mathematics educator
 Mónica Clapp, Mexican researcher in nonlinear partial differential equations and algebraic topology
 Joan Clarke (1917–1996), English code-breaker at Bletchley Park, numismatist
 Jeanne N. Clelland (born 1970), American expert on differential geometry and its applications to differential equations
 Mary Clem (1905–1979), American mathematician and human computer, invented zero check error detection
 Harriet Redfield Cobb (1866–1958), American mathematician
 Anne Cobbe (1920–1971), British algebraist
 Sally Cockburn (born 1960), Canadian-American mathematician
 Judita Cofman (1936–2001), Yugoslav-German finite geometer and mathematics educator, first mathematics doctorate from Novi Sad
 Doris Cohen, American mathematician, first female author in the National Advisory Committee for Aeronautics
 Elaine Cohen, American pioneer in the use of splines for geometric modeling
 Marion Cohen (born 1943), American poet and mathematician, teaches the relationship between art and mathematics
 Miriam Cohen (born 1941), Israeli researcher in Hopf algebras, quantum groups and non-commutative rings
 Amy Cohen-Corwin, American expert in the Korteweg–de Vries equation and cubic Schrödinger equation
 Alina Carmen Cojocaru, Romanian number theorist
 Nancy Cole (1902–1991), American mathematician, made pioneering contributions to Morse theory
 Caroline Colijn, Canadian mathematical epidemiologist
 Susan Jane Colley (born 1959), first female editor-in-chief of the American Mathematical Monthly
 Agnes Bell Collier (1860–1930), British mathematician
 Karen L. Collins, American graph theorist and combinatorist
 Sandra Collins (born 1970), Irish fluid dynamicist and librarian
 Coralie Colmez, French writer on legal mathematics
 Maria Colombo (born 1989), Italian mathematical analyst
 Caterina Consani (born 1963), Italian mathematician specializing in arithmetic geometry
 Pamela Cook, American expert in fluid dynamics, president of SIAM
 Frances Cope (1902–1983), American researcher on differential equations, namesake of the Thorndike nomogram
 Minerva Cordero, Puerto Rican expert on finite geometry
 Lesley Cormack (born 1957), Canadian historian of mathematics and historian of geography
 Sylvie Corteel, French combinatorialist, former editor-in-chief of Journal of Combinatorial Theory, Series A
 Véronique Cortier, French mathematician and computer scientist, uses mathematical logic to verify cryptographic protocols
 Carla Cotwright-Williams (born 1973), African-American data scientist for the US government
 Pamela G. Coxson, American applied mathematician specializing in disease modeling
 Collette Coullard, American matroid theorist and operations researcher
 Judith Covington, American mathematics educator
 Lenore Cowen, American discrete mathematician, computer scientist, and computational biologist
 Elizabeth Buchanan Cowley (1874–1945), American mathematician, advocated high school teaching of solid geometry
 Annalisa Crannell, American expert on water waves and geometric perspective
 Alissa Crans, American mathematician specializing in higher-dimensional algebra
 Mary Croarken, British historian of mathematics and of computing
 Marie Crous, 17th-century mathematician who introduced the decimal system to France
 Ana Bela Cruzeiro (born 1957), Portuguese and Swiss stochastic analyst
 Marianna Csörnyei (born 1975), Hungarian researcher in real analysis, geometric measure theory, and functional analysis
 Helen F. Cullen (1919–2007), American topologist
 Jane Cullum (born 1938), American applied mathematician known for her work in numerical algorithms and control theory
 Louise Duffield Cummings (1870–1947), Canadian-American expert on Steiner triple systems
 Susan Jane Cunningham (1842–1921), founded the mathematics and astronomy departments at Swarthmore College
 Serafina Cuomo (born 1966), Italian historian of ancient mathematics
 Antonella Cupillari (born 1955), Italian-American mathematics educator, historian of mathematics, and biographer of Agnesi
 Ruth F. Curtain (1941–2018), Australian-Dutch expert in infinite-dimensional linear systems
 Carina Curto (born 1978), American mathematical neuroscientist
 Eleanor P. Cushing (1856–1925), American mathematician
 Elizabeth Cuthill (1923–2011), American applied mathematician and Navy researcher known for sparse matrix ordering
 Annie Cuyt (born 1956), Belgian expert on approximation

D

 Sophie Dabo-Niang, Senegalese-French mathematician and statistician
 Amy Dahan, French mathematician, historian of mathematics, and historian of the politics of climate change
 Karma Dajani, Lebanese-Dutch mathematician, applies ergodic theory to number theory
 Anne-Laure Dalibard, French mathematician, expert on fluid dynamics in oceanography
 Ewa Damek (born 1958), Polish mathematical analyst, namesake of Damek–Ricci spaces
 Pallavi Dani, Indian-American geometric group theorist
 Donatella Danielli (born 1966), Italian-American specialist in partial differential equations
 Sofia Danova (1879–1946), Bulgarian teacher and philanthropist, first Bulgarian woman to graduate in mathematics
 Christine Darden (born 1942), American aeronautical engineer who researches sonic booms
 Geraldine Claudette Darden (born 1936), one of the first African-American women to earn a PhD in mathematics
 Panagiota Daskalopoulos, Greek-American differential geometer
 Ingrid Daubechies (born 1954), Belgian physicist and mathematician, known for wavelets
 Monique Dauge (born 1956), French mathematician and numerical analyst
 Chantal David (born 1964), Canadian analytic number theorist and arithmetic statistician
 Giuliana Davidoff, American number theorist and expert on expander graphs
 Penny J. Davies, Scottish expert on wave scattering, president of Edinburgh Mathematical Society
 Nicole De Grande-De Kimpe (1936–2008), Belgian pioneer in -adic functional analysis
 Christine De Mol (born 1954), Belgian applied mathematician and mathematical physicist
 Ineke De Moortel, Belgian mathematician who studies the sun's corona; president of Edinburgh Mathematical Society
 Valeria de Paiva, Brazilian researcher in categorical logic
 Lisette de Pillis, American researcher on the mathematics of cancer growth
 Kaye A. de Ruiz, American mathematics educator
 Daniela De Silva, Italian mathematician known for her expertise in partial differential equations
 Luz de Teresa (born 1965), Mexican control theorist, president of Mexican Mathematical Society
 Gerda de Vries, Canadian mathematician who studies dynamical systems and mathematical physiology
 Winifred Margaret Deans (1901–1990), British translator of German mathematics and physics texts into English
 Mary Deconge (born 1933), one of the first African-American women to earn a PhD in mathematics
 Maria Deijfen (born 1975), Swedish graph theorist and probability theorist
 Huguette Delavault (1924–2003), French mathematical physicist, activist for women in mathematics
 Ermelinda DeLaViña, Hispanic American graph theorist
 Laura DeMarco, American researcher in dynamical systems and complex analysis
 Beryl May Dent (1900–1977), British mathematical physicist, researcher in molecular forces and computer-aided design
 Darinka Dentcheva, Bulgarian-American convex analyst
 Marjorie Devaney (1931–2007), mathematician, electrical engineer, and pioneering computer programmer
 Shakuntala Devi  (1939–2013), Indian child prodigy, writer, and mental calculator
 Cécile DeWitt-Morette (1922–2017), French founder of l'École de physique des Houches
 Elena Deza (born 1961), French-Russian mathematician, author of books on figurate numbers and metric spaces
 Mariangiola Dezani-Ciancaglini (born 1946), Italian expert on type theory, lambda calculus, and programming language semantics
 Eleonora Di Nezza, Italian Kahler geometer
 Giulia Di Nunno (born 1973), Italian expert in stochastic analysis and financial mathematics, promoter of mathematics in Africa
 Sandra Di Rocco (born 1967), Italian-Swedish algebraic geometer
 Carrie Diaz Eaton, American mathematical biologist
 Auguste Dick (1910–1993), Austrian historian of mathematics and biographer of Emmy Noether
 Alicia Dickenstein (born 1955), Argentine algebraic geometer, vice-president of the International Mathematical Union
 Caren Diefenderfer (1952–2017), American mathematician, president of National Numeracy Network
 Susanne Dierolf (1942–2009), German expert on topological vector spaces
 Ada Dietz (1882–1950), American weaver who used algebraic expressions to design textiles
 Ulla Dinger (born 1955), Swedish mathematical analyst, first female doctorate in mathematics at University of Gothenburg
 Irit Dinur, Israeli researcher in probabilistically checkable proofs and hardness of approximation
 Serena Dipierro, Italian expert on partial differential equations
 Susanne Ditlevsen, Danish mathematical biologist and biostatistician
 Mary P. Dolciani (1923–1985), developed modern method for teaching high school algebra in the United States
 Yvonne Dold-Samplonius (1937–2014), Dutch historian of Islamic mathematics
 Suzanne Dorée, American group theorist and mathematics educator
 Isabel Dotti, Argentine expert on homogeneous manifolds
 Itala D'Ottaviano (born 1944), Brazilian logician
 Yael Dowker (1919–2016), Israeli researcher in measure theory and ergodic theory
 Agnes Meyer Driscoll (1889–1971), American cryptanalyst during both World War I and World War II
 Cornelia Druțu Romanian mathematician, won Whitehead Prize for research in geometric group theory
 Malgorzata Dubiel, Polish and Canadian mathematics educator
 Marie-Louise Dubreil-Jacotin (1905–1972), first woman full professor of mathematics in France, expert in fluid mechanics and abstract algebra
 Moon Duchin, American expert in geometric topology, geometric group theory, and Teichmüller theory
 Marie Duflo (1940–2019), French probability theorist, activist for foreigners in France
 Vida Dujmović (born 1972), Yugoslav-Canadian graph theorist
 Della Dumbaugh, American historian of mathematics, editor-in-chief of American Mathematical Monthly
 Ioana Dumitriu (born 1976), Romanian-American numerical analyst
 Julena Steinheider Duncombe (1911–2003), American mathematics teacher and astronomer
 Elizabeth B. Dussan V. (born 1946), American expert on the behavior of fluids
 Nira Dyn, Israeli expert on subdivision surfaces

E

 Annie Easley (1933–2011), African-American computer scientist, mathematician, and rocket scientist
 Sheila May Edmonds (1916–2002), British mathematician, Vice-Principal of Newnham College, Cambridge
 Josephine D. Edwards (1942–1985), Australian mathematician, founded Australian Mathematics Competition
 Mary Edwards (c. 1750–1815), human computer for the British Nautical Almanac
 Constance van Eeden (1927–2021), Dutch nonparameteric statistician who contributed to the development of statistics in Canada
 Hettie Belle Ege (1861–1942), American mathematician, acting president of Mills College
 Tatyana Pavlovna Ehrenfest (1905–1984), Dutch researcher in combinatorics and graph theory
 Andrée Ehresmann (born 1935), French category theorist
 Gertrude Ehrlich (born 1923), Austrian-American algebraist and number theorist
 Thyra Eibe (1866–1955), first woman to earn a mathematics degree from the University of Copenhagen, translator of Euclid
 Bettina Eick (born 1968), German computational group theorist
 Carolyn Eisele (1902–2000), American mathematician, historian of mathematics, expert on Charles Sanders Peirce
 Nathalie Eisenbaum, French probability theorist
 Kirsten Eisenträger, German-American researcher in computational number theory
 Tanja Eisner (born 1980), Ukrainian-German expert on operator theory
 Nicole El Karoui (born 1944), Tunisian-French pioneer in mathematical finance
 Amèle El Mahdi (born 1956), Algerian mathematics professor and writer
 Nerida Ellerton (born 1942), Australian mathematics educator and historian of mathematics education
 Joanne Elliott (born 1925), American mathematician specializing in potential theory
 Jo Ellis-Monaghan, American mathematician interested in graph polynomials and topological graph theory
 Maria Emelianenko, Russian-American expert on centroidal Voronoi tessellation
 Gisela Engeln-Müllges (born 1940), escapee from East Germany, expert in numerical algorithms, and abstract artist
 Susanna S. Epp (born 1943), American researcher in discrete mathematics and mathematical logic
 Karin Erdmann (born 1948), German researcher in modular representation theory and homological algebra
 Viveka Erlandsson, Swedish low-dimensional topologist and geometer
 Anna Erschler (born 1977), Russian-French expert on random walks on groups
 Hélène Esnault (born 1953), French algebraic geometer, winner of the Gottfried Wilhelm Leibniz Prize
 Maria J. Esteban (born 1956), Basque-French applied mathematician, president of International Council for Industrial and Applied Mathematics
 Alison Etheridge FRS (born 1964), English researcher in theoretical population genetics and mathematical ecology
 Christina Eubanks-Turner, American mathematics educator, graph theorist, and commutative algebraist

F

 Vera Faddeeva (1906–1983), Russian expert on numerical linear algebra
 Fariba Fahroo, Persian-American expert in pseudospectral optimal control, winner of AIAA Mechanics and Control of Flight Award
 Barbara Trader Faires (born 1943), American mathematician and textbook author, secretary of MAA
 Bianca Falcidieno, Italian applied mathematician, pioneer of semantics-driven shape modeling
 Etta Zuber Falconer (1933–2002), one of the first African-American women to receive a PhD in mathematics
 Ruma Falk (1932–2020), Israeli psychologist and philosopher of mathematics specializing in human understanding of probability
 María Falk de Losada, American-born Colombian mathematician, co-founded Colombian Mathematical Olympiad, rector of Antonio Nariño University
 Mary Fama (1938–2021), New Zealand applied mathematician, expert on rock deformation in mining
 Martha Isabel Fandiño Pinilla (born 1956), Colombian and Italian mathematics educator
 Barbara Fantechi (born 1966), Italian algebraic geometer
 Rosa María Farfán, Mexican researcher in social epistemology and mathematics education
 Marie Farge (born 1953), French mathematician and physicist known for her research on wavelets and turbulence in fluid mechanics
 Mary Celine Fasenmyer (1906–1996), Catholic nun whose research on hypergeometric functions prefigured WZ theory
 Heike Fassbender, German expert in numerical linear algebra, first woman to lead a German mathematical society
 Lisa Fauci (born 1960), American applied mathematician who applies computational fluid dynamics to biological processes
 Patricia Fauring, Argentine mathematician, coach of the Argentine mathematical olympiad team
 Odile Favaron (born 1938), French graph theorist
 Philippa Fawcett (1868–1948), English educationalist, first woman to obtain the top score in the Cambridge Mathematical Tripos
 Anita Burdman Feferman (1927–2015), American historian of mathematics and mathematical biographer
 Nina Fefferman, American mathematical biologist
 Eva-Maria Feichtner (born 1972), German algebraic geometer
 Joan Feigenbaum (born 1958), theoretical computer scientist, co-inventor of trust management
 Genevieve Grotjan Feinstein (1912–2006), helped decipher Japanese Purple cryptography, worked on Venona counter-intelligence
 Käte Fenchel (1905–1983), Jewish German researcher on non-abelian groups
 Zhilan Feng (born 1959), Chinese-American applied mathematician, mathematical biologist, and epidemiologist
 Elizabeth Fennema (1928–2021), researched attitudes of young women towards mathematics and their classroom interactions
 Anuška Ferligoj (born 1947), Slovenian mathematical sociologist and researcher in network analysis
 Begoña Fernández, Mexican probability theorist and expert in mathematical finance
 Elena Fernández (born 1956), Spanish operations researcher, president of Association of European Operational Research Societies
 Marisa Fernández, Spanish differential geometer
 Jacqueline Ferrand (1918–2014), French researcher on conformal representation theory, potential theory, and Riemannian manifolds
 Antonia Ferrín Moreiras (1914–2009), Spanish mathematician and first Galician woman astronomer
 Joan Ferrini-Mundy (born 1954), American researcher in mathematics education
 Judith V. Field (born 1943), British historian of mathematics and art
 Anna Fino, Italian differential geometer
 Jessica Fintzen, German -adic representation theorist
 Farideh Firoozbakht (1962–2019), Iranian number theorist
 Ilse Fischer (born 1975), Austrian combinatorialist
 Irene Fischer (1907–2009), Austrian-American geodesist for Mercury and Apollo spaceflights, member of National Academy of Engineering
 Vera Fischer, Austrian set theorist and mathematical logician
 Naomi Fisher, American mathematics educator, worked to bring together research mathematicians and educators
 Mary Flahive (born 1948), American mathematician, author of books on difference equations and diophantine approximation
 Sarah Flannery (born 1982), winner of the EU Young Scientist of the Year Award for her teenage research on cryptography
 Erica Flapan (born 1956), American researcher in low-dimensional topology and knot theory
 Jennifer Flegg, Australian applied mathematician
 Irmgard Flügge-Lotz (1903–1974), German aerodynamics researcher, first female engineering professor at Stanford
 Natasha Flyer (born 1969), American earth scientist and applied mathematician, expert on radial basis functions
 Anne Bosworth Focke (1868–1907), first mathematics professor at what is now University of Rhode Island; student of David Hilbert
 Amanda Folsom (born 1979), American number theorist
 Irene Fonseca  (born 1956), Portuguese-American director of the Center for Nonlinear Analysis at Carnegie Mellon University
 Phyllis Fox (born 1923), American mathematician and computer scientist, collaborator on the first LISP interpreter
 Marguerite Frank (born 1927), French-American pioneer in convex optimization theory and mathematical programming
 Hélène Frankowska, Polish-French control theorist and set-valued analyst
 Ailana Fraser, Canadian researcher on geometric analysis and the theory of minimal surfaces
 Elena Freda (1890–1978), Italian mathematician, applied mathematical analysis to electromagnetics and biology
 Haya Freedman (1923–2005), Israeli-British mathematician who studied the Tamari lattice and ring theory
 Herta Freitag (1908–2000), Austrian-American expert on Fibonacci numbers
 Susan Friedlander (born 1946), English-American researcher in fluid dynamics, first female editor-in-chief of the Bulletin of the AMS
 Joyce Friedman (1928–2018), American mathematician, operations researcher, computer scientist, and computational linguist
 Aline Huke Frink (1904–2000), American mathematician and professor
 Charlotte Froese Fischer (born 1929), Canadian-American expert on atomic-structure calculations who predicted negative calcium ions
 Hannah Fry (born 1984), English complex systems theorist and public speaker
 Shirley M. Frye, American mathematics educator, president of National Council of Teachers of Mathematics
 Elza Furtado Gomide (1925–2013), Brazilian mathematician, first female doctorate in mathematics at University of São Paulo
 Cohl Furey, Canadian mathematical physicist
 Fumiko Futamura, Japanese-American mathematician, expert on graphical perspective

G

 Lisl Gaal (born 1924), Austrian-born American set theorist and Galois theorist
 Isabelle Gallagher (born 1973), French researcher in partial differential equations
 Eva Gallardo (born 1971), president of Spanish Mathematical Society
 Irene M. Gamba (born 1957), Argentine-American applied mathematician
 Svetlana Gannushkina (born 1942), Russian mathematician and human rights activist
 Nina Gantert, Swiss and German probability theorist
 Kseniya Garaschuk (born 1982), Soviet-born Canadian mathematics educator, editor of Crux Mathematicorum
 Pascale Garaud, French-American applied mathematician interested in fluid dynamics, magnetohydrodynamics, and their applications to astrophysics
 Laura Gardini (born 1952), Italian mathematician, applies chaotic dynamics to economics
 Manuela Garín (1914–2019), Spanish-born pioneer of Mexican mathematics
 Annie Marie Watkins Garraway (born 1940), American mathematician who worked in telecommunications and electronic data transmission
 Adriana Garroni (born 1966), Italian mathematician, expert on modeling plasticity and fracture
 Mary Cleophas Garvin (1899–1990), American mathematician
 Geneviève Gauthier (born 1967), Canadian financial mathematician, statistician, and decision scientist
 Véronique Gayrard, French probability theorist
 Mai Gehrke (born 1964), Danish lattice theorist and mathematical logician
 Hilda Geiringer (1893–1973), Austrian researcher on Fourier series, statistics, probability, and plasticity, refugee from Nazi Germany
 Anne Gelb, American mathematician interested in numerical analysis, partial differential equations, and Fourier analysis of images
 Sue Geller, American mathematician with interdisciplinary interests in algebraic K-theory, bioinformatics, and biostatistics
 Hélyette Geman, French researcher in mathematical finance
 Ruth Gentry (1862–1917), American geometer
 Sommer Gentry, American mathematician, applies dance notation to haptic interaction and operations research to organ transplants
 Maria-Pia Geppert (1907–1997), German mathematician and biostatistician who founded the Biometrical Journal
 Ralucca Gera, American graph theorist and mathematics educator
 Sophie Germain (1776–1831), French number theorist, physicist, and philosopher, correspondent of Gauss
 Marie Gernet (1865–1924), first German woman to earn a doctorate in mathematics
 Nadeschda Gernet (1877–1943), Russian mathematician, student of David Hilbert, worked in the calculus of variations
 Judith Gersting (born 1940), American mathematician, computer scientist, and textbook author
 Ellen Gethner, American graph theorist
 Patrizia Gianni (born 1952), Italian expert in computer algebra
 Danuta Gierulanka (1909–1995), Polish mathematics educator and philosopher of mathematics
 Irène Gijbels, Belgian mathematical statistician and expert in nonparametric statistics
 Olga Gil Medrano (born 1956), Spanish geometric analyst, first female president of the Royal Spanish Mathematical Society
 Anna C. Gilbert (born 1972), American expert in streaming algorithms and matching pursuit
 Jane Piore Gilman (born 1945), topologist and group theorist, distinguished professor of mathematics at Rutgers University
 Gloria Ford Gilmer, American ethnomathematician
 Joella Gipson (1929–2012), American music educator and mathematics educator, first African-American student at Mt. St. Mary's College
 Vivette Girault (born 1943), French expert on numerical analysis, finite element methods, and computational fluid dynamics
 E. G. Glagoleva (1926–2015), Soviet and Russian mathematician, mathematics educator, and textbook author
 Josephine Burns Glasgow (1887–1969), American group theorist, active in American Association of University Women
 Muriel Glauert (1892–1949), British mathematician and aerodynamicist
 Sarah Glaz (born 1947), Romanian-Israeli-American commutative algebraist and mathematical poet
 Heide Gluesing-Luerssen (born 1961), German mathematician specializing in algebraic coding theory
 Julia Gog, English mathematical biologist, uses mathematics to study the spread of infectious diseases
 Linda Gojak, American mathematics educator, president of National Council of Teachers of Mathematics
 Nüzhet Gökdoğan (1910–2003), Turkish astronomer and mathematician, founder of Turkish Mathematical Society
 Bonnie Gold (born 1948), American mathematician, mathematical logician, philosopher of mathematics, and mathematics educator
 Lisa Goldberg, American mathematical finance scholar and statistician
 Rebecca Goldin, American expert in symplectic geometry
 Christina Goldschmidt, British probability theorist
 Catherine Goldstein (born 1958), French number theorist and historian of mathematics
 Gisèle Ruiz Goldstein (born 1958), American expert in partial differential equations, operator theory, and mathematical finance
 Susan Goldstine, American mathematician active in mathematics and fiber arts
 Shafi Goldwasser (born 1958), American-born Israeli theoretical cryptographer
 Concha Gómez, Italian and Cuban-American mathematician and advocate for diversity in STEM
 Sherry Gong, second American gold medal winner at International Mathematical Olympiad
 Enriqueta González Baz (1915–2002), first woman to earn a mathematics degree in Mexico, founder of the Mexican Mathematical Society
 Valentina Gorbachuk (born 1937), Ukrainian operator theorist
 Maria Gordina (born 1968), Russian-American mathematical analyst
 Carolyn S. Gordon (born 1950), isospectral geometer who proved that you can't hear the shape of a drum
 Julia Gordon, Canadian representation theorist, winner of Michler and Krieger–Nelson prizes
 Pamela Gorkin, American complex analyst and textbook author
 Sigal Gottlieb, American expert in numerical simulation of the partial differential equations used in aerodynamics
 Aline Gouget (born 1977), French cryptographer
 Mary de Lellis Gough (1892–1983), American mathematician
 Alice Bache Gould (1858–1953), American mathematician and historian
 Gene Grabeel (1920–2015), American mathematician and cryptanalyst who founded the Venona project
 Judith Grabiner (born 1938), American historian of 18th- and 19th-century mathematics
 Eva-Maria Graefe, German-English mathematical physicist, expert in ultracold atoms and Non-Hermitian quantum mechanics
 Christine Graffigne (born 1959), French expert on Markov random fields for image analysis
 Maria Gramegna (1887–1915), Italian mathematician, pioneer of abstraction in functional analysis
 Evelyn Boyd Granville (born 1924), one of the first African-American women to receive a PhD in mathematics
 Antonella Grassi, mathematician specializing in algebraic geometry and string theory
 Mary Graustein (1884–1972), American mathematician, first mathematical doctorate from Radcliffe College
 Marion Cameron Gray (1902–1979), Scottish telephone engineer, discoverer of the Gray graph
 Mary W. Gray (born 1939), author on mathematics, mathematics education, economic equity, discrimination law, and academic freedom
 Judy Green (born 1943), logician and historian of women in mathematics
 Anne Greenbaum (born 1951), American expert in theoretical and numerical linear algebra
 Catherine Greenhill, Australian graph theorist
 Sarah J. Greenwald, American mathematician, studies connections between mathematics and society
 Cindy Greenwood (born 1937), Canadian statistician, winner of Krieger-Nelson Prize
 Sina Greenwood, New Zealand topologist
 Ruth Gregory, British mathematical physicist specializing in general relativity and cosmology
 Margaret Greig (1922–1999), English applied mathematician, developed theory for worsted spinning
 Harriet Griffin (1903–1991), American mathematician, author of a textbook on number theory
 Lois Wilfred Griffiths (1899–1981), American expert on polygonal numbers
 Laura Grigori, French applied mathematician, known for communication-avoiding algorithms for numerical linear algebra
 Ellina Grigorieva, Russian expert on mathematical problem solving
 Elisenda Grigsby, American low-dimensional topologist
 Clara Grima (born 1971), Spanish computational geometer, co-discoverer of scutoids, mathematics popularizer
 Margaret Grimshaw (1905–1990), English mathematician at Cambridge and author on Hilbert spaces
 Birgit Grodal (1943–2004), Danish mathematical economist, studied atomless economies
 Ione Grogan (1891–1961), American schoolteacher, mathematics professor, and literary club leader
 Edna Grossman, German-born American designer of the Data Encryption Standard and of the slide attack in cryptography
 Marcia Groszek, American mathematician whose research concerns mathematical logic, set theory, forcing, and recursion theory
 Gerd Grubb (born 1939), Danish expert on pseudodifferential operators
 Helen G. Grundman, American number theorist
 Weiqing Gu, Chinese-American researcher on differential geometry and the mathematics of cancer growth
 Rebeca Guber (1926–2020), Argentine mathematician, founder of Argentine Calculation Society
 Christine Guenther, American expert on the Ricci flow
 Laura Guggenbühl (1901–1985), American mathematician known for her work in triangle geometry and the history of mathematics
 Colette Guillopé, French researcher in partial differential equations and fluid dynamics, former president of femmes et mathématiques
 Joséphine Guidy Wandja (born 1945), Ivorian mathematician
 Alice Guionnet (born 1969), French probability theorist
 Geneviève Guitel (1895–1982), French mathematician who studied natural-language numbering systems
 Kanta Gupta (1938–2016), Indian-Canadian researcher on abstract algebra and group theory
 Neena Gupta, Indian mathematician who solved the Zariski cancellation problem
 Rona Gurkewitz, American mathematician and computer scientist known for her work on modular origami
 Margaret Gurney (1908–2002), American mathematician, survey statistician, and pioneering computer programmer
 Rochelle Gutierrez, American education theorist who studies the impacts of race, class and language on mathematics education
 Simone Gutt (born 1956), Belgian differential geometer
 Martha Guzmán Partida, Mexican functional analyst

H

 Ruth Haas, American mathematician known for mentorship of other women mathematicians
 Violet B. Haas (1926–1986), American control theorist
 Olga Hadžić (1946–1995), Serbian expert on fixed-point theorems
 Dörte Haftendorn (born 1948), German mathematician, mathematics educator, and textbook author
 Kari Hag (born 1941), Norwegian expert on quasiconformal mappings
 Elisabeth Hagemann (born 1906), early German female doctorate in mathematics
 Marjorie Hahn (born 1948), American probability theorist and tennis player
 Deborah Tepper Haimo (1921–2007), Ukrainian-Palestinian-American classical analyst, third female president of the Mathematical Association of America
 Susie W. Håkansson (born 1940), mathematics educator, director of the California Mathematics Project
 Ursula Hamenstädt (born 1961), German differential geometry
 Christine Hamill (1923–1956), English mathematician specializing in group theory and finite geometry
 Mary-Elizabeth Hamstrom (1927–2009), American topologist
 Xiaoying Han, Chinese mathematician who studies random dynamical systems and stochastic differential equations
 Gila Hanna (born 1934), Canadian mathematics educator and philosopher of mathematics
 Anita Hansbo (born 1960), Swedish mathematician, rector of Jönköping University
 Megumi Harada, Canadian expert on equivariant symplectic and algebraic geometry
 Alison Harcourt (born 1929), Australian mathematician and statistician known for branch and bound algorithms and quantification of poverty in Australia
 Frances Hardcastle (1866–1941), group theorist, one of the founders of the American Mathematical Society
 Kathryn E. Hare (born 1959), Canadian expert in harmonic analysis
 Valentina Harizanov, Serbian-American researcher in computability and model theory
 Dorothee Haroske (born 1968), German expert on function spaces
 Heather Harrington (born 1984), applied mathematician and algebraic systems biologist
 Leona Harris, American mathematician and diversity activist
 Pamela E. Harris, Mexican combinatorist and mathematics blogger
 Jenny Harrison, American expert on generalized functions and minimal surfaces
 Frances Harshbarger (1902–1987), one of the first female American mathematicians to receive a doctorate
 Bertha Hart, American mathematician
 Sarah B. Hart, British group theorist
 Shelly Harvey, American researcher in knot theory, low-dimensional topology, and group theory
 Mary Gertrude Haseman (1889–1979), American knot theorist
 Asma Hassannezhad, Iranian spectral geometer
 Maria Hasse (1921–2014), German graph theorist, set theorist, and category theorist, first female professor in science at TU Dresden
 Rhonda Hatcher, American number theorist, winner of Haimo teaching award
 Deanna Haunsperger, American mathematician, former president of the Mathematical Association of America
 Jane M. Hawkins, American researcher in dynamic systems, complex dynamics, cellular automata, and Julia sets
 Louise Hay (1935–1989), founding member of the Association for Women in Mathematics
 Linda B. Hayden (born 1949), African-American mathematics educator and mathematical geoscientist known for mentorship of women and minorities
 Ellen Hayes (1851–1930), American mathematician, astronomer, and political radical
 Margaret Hayman (1923–1994), British mathematics educator, co-founder of British Mathematical Olympiad
 Euphemia Lofton Haynes (1890–1980), first African-American woman to earn a PhD in mathematics
 Sarah D. Allen Oren Haynes (1836–1907), first female state librarian of Indiana and first female faculty member at Purdue University
 Teresa W. Haynes (born 1953), American expert on domination in graphs
 Emilie Virginia Haynsworth (1916–1985), American linear algebraist known for Schur complements and Haynsworth inertia additivity formula
 Olive Hazlett (1890–1974), American algebraist at the University of Illinois
 Sandra Mitchell Hedetniemi (born 1949), American researcher in graph theory and graph algorithms
 Maria Heep-Altiner (born 1959), German mathematician and actuary
 Jane Heffernan, Canadian mathematician who studies mathematical models for the spread of infectious disease
 Katherine Heinrich (born 1954), Canadian combinatorialist, first female president of Canadian Mathematical Society
 Christine Heitsch, American expert on the mathematics of RNA structure
 Diane Henderson, American applied mathematician and experimental fluid dynamics researcher
 Nadia Heninger (born 1982), American cryptographer, computer security expert, and computational number theorist
 Cora Barbara Hennel (1888–1947), American mathematician, first woman to earn a doctorate in mathematics at the Indiana University
 Dagmar R. Henney (born 1931), German-American expert on additive set-values and Banach spaces
 Inge Henningsen (born 1941), statistician, writer and feminist
 Allison Henrich (born 1980), American knot theorist
 Shandelle Henson (born 1964), American mathematician and mathematical biologist, expert on population dynamics
 Rebecca A. Herb (born 1948), American researcher in abstract algebra and Lie groups
 Raphaèle Herbin, French expert on the finite volume method
 Grete Hermann (1901–1984), German mathematician and philosopher also noted for her work in physics and education
 Susan Hermiller, American group theorist
 Norma Hernández (born 1934), American mathematics educator, studied factors affecting Mexican-American mathematics students
 Constance Anne Herschel (1855–1939), British lecturer in natural sciences and mathematics
 Patricia Hersh (born 1973), American expert on algebraic and topological combinatorics
 Bobby Hersom (born 1929), British mathematician and computer scientist
 Kathryn Hess (born 1967), American mathematician who uses algebraic topology to understand structures in neurology and materials science
 Silvia Heubach, German-American mathematician specializing in enumerative combinatorics, combinatorial game theory, and bioinformatics
 Gloria Conyers Hewitt (born 1935), early African-American female mathematics PhD, MAA governor
 Laurie Heyer, American mathematician specializing in genomics and bioinformatics
 Patricia Hiddleston (1933–2017), Scottish and Rhodesian mathematician
 Aparna Higgins, Indian-American graph theorist known for encouraging undergraduate research
 Raegan Higgins, American mathematician, co-director of the EDGE program for Women
 Nancy Hingston, American differential geometer
 Wei Ho, American arithmetic geometer
 Hoàng Xuân Sính (born 1933), first female Vietnamese mathematician, student of Grothendieck, founder of Thang Long University
 Catherine Hobbs (born 1968), British singularity theorist, applies geometry to robotics
 Dorit S. Hochbaum (born 1949), American expert on approximation algorithms for facility location, covering and packing, and scheduling
 Marlis Hochbruck (born 1964), German expert on matrix exponentials and their applications to differential equations
 Maria Hoffmann-Ostenhof (born 1947), Austrian expert on the Schrödinger equation
 Leslie Hogben, American mathematician specializing in graph theory and linear algebra, known for graduate mentorship
 Nina Holden, Norwegian probability theorist
 Judy A. Holdener (born 1965), American number theorist who simplified the proof of Touchard's theorem on perfect numbers
 Barbara R. Holland (born 1976), New Zealand born Australian phylogeneticist
 Lotte Hollands (born 1981), Dutch mathematical physicist
 Tara S. Holm, American algebraic geometer and symplectic geometer
 Olga Holtz (born 1973), Russian numerical analyst, winner of the European Mathematical Society Prize
 Betty W. Holz (1919–2005), American mathematician and defense analyst
 Jennifer Hom, American low-dimensional topologist
 Letong (Carina) Hong (born 2001), Chinese mathematics student
 Dorothy McFadden Hoover (1918–2000), American human computer involved in the design of swept-wing aircraft
 Grace Hopper (1906–1992), American computer scientist and United States Navy rear admiral
 Eleanor Mollie Horadam (1921–2002), English-Australian mathematician, studied generalized integers, mother of Kathy
 Kathy Horadam (born 1951), Australian mathematician, studies Hadamard matrices, daughter of Eleanor Mollie
 Annick Horiuchi, French historian of Japanese mathematics
 Anette Hosoi, American mechanical engineer, biophysicist, and mathematician, studies fluid dynamics, robotics, and bio-inspired design
 Victoria Howle, American expert in numerical linear algebra, founded AWM essay contest
 Susan Howson (born 1973), British mathematician known for work on algebraic number theory and arithmetic geometry
 Rebecca Hoyle, British applied mathematician, expert on pattern formation
 Celia Hoyles (born 1946), British mathematician, president of the Institute of Mathematics and its Applications
 Christine Hrenya, American computational fluid dynamicist, expert in fluidization and multiphase flow
 Pao-sheng Hsu, Mathematics educator, founder of AWM Teacher Partnership Program
 Hu Hesheng (born 1928), differential geometer, president of Shanghai Mathematical Society, member of Chinese Academy of Science
 Katharina T. Huber (born 1965), German mathematical biologist, expert in the foundations and visualization of phylogeny
 Verena Huber-Dyson (1923–2016), Swiss-American group theorist and logician, expert on undecidability in group theory
 Annette Huber-Klawitter (born 1967), German algebraic geometer, expert in the Bloch–Kato conjectures
 Vera Huckel, American human computer at the National Advisory Committee for Aeronautics
 Anne Lester Hudson, American expert in topological semigroups, mathematics educator, and mathematics competition coach
 Hilda Phoebe Hudson (1881–1965), English researcher on Cremona transformations in algebraic geometry
 Sabine Van Huffel (born 1958), Belgian applied mathematician, expert on total least squares and applications to medical diagnostics
 Rhonda Hughes (born 1947), American wavelet researcher, president of the Association for Women in Mathematics
 Deborah Hughes Hallett, mathematics education reformer
 Birge Huisgen-Zimmermann (born 1946), German-American representation theorist and ring theorist
 Dominique Hulin (born 1959), French differential geometer
 Mabel Gweneth Humphreys (1911–2006), Canadian-American number theorist and namesake of the M. Gweneth Humphreys Award
 Eugénie Hunsicker, American mathematician who works at the intersection of analysis, geometry and topology
 Fern Hunt (born 1948), American mathematician known for her work in applied mathematics and mathematical biology
 Bobbie Hunter, New Zealand educational theorist and mathematics educator
 Louise Stokes Hunter (died 1988), American mathematics educator, first African-American woman with a degree from the University of Virginia
 Joan Hutchinson (born 1945), American graph theorist who extended the planar separator theorem to graphs of higher genus
 Marie Hušková (born 1942), Czech mathematician who worked in theoretical statistics and change-point problems
 Hypatia (died 415), head of the Neoplatonic school at Alexandria, murdered by a Christian mob

I
 Milagros D. Ibe (born 1931), Filipino mathematics educator, vice chancellor of the University of the Philippines Diliman
 Mihaela Ignatova, Bulgarian mathematical analyst
 Annette Imhausen (born 1970), German historian of ancient Egyptian mathematics
 Tasha Inniss, first African-American woman to earn a Ph.D. from the University of Maryland, director of education for INFORMS
 Eleny Ionel, Romanian-American symplectic geometer
 Alessandra Iozzi (born 1959), Italian-American-Swiss geometric group theorist
 Ilse Ipsen, German-American expert in numerical linear algebra
 Valerie Isham (born 1947), British applied probabilist, president of Royal Statistical Society
 Shihoko Ishii (born 1950), Japanese mathematician specializing in algebraic geometry
 Vanaja Iyengar ( –2001), founding vice chancellor of Sri Padmavati Mahila Visvavidyalayam, a women's university in Andhra Pradesh, India

J

 Trachette Jackson (born 1972), researcher in mathematical oncology, second African-American woman to become a Sloan Fellow in mathematics
 Jessie Marie Jacobs (1890–1954), fired from mathematics instructorship for having a child, aided husband Hermann Muller's Nobel-winning genetic research
 Alex James, British and New Zealand applied mathematician, mathematical biologist, and epidemiologist
 Cathérine Jami (born 1961), French historian of Chinese mathematics
 Jeannette Janssen, Dutch and Canadian graph theorist
 Monique Jeanblanc (born 1947), French financial mathematician
 Lisa Jeffrey FRSC, Canadian expert in symplectic geometry and quantum field theory
 Erica Jen, American applied mathematician, studies mathematical analysis of chaotic and complex behavior
 Carrie Ichikawa Jenkins, Canadian philosopher of mathematics
 Jacqueline Jensen-Vallin, American low-dimensional topologist, editor of MAA FOCUS
 Svetlana Jitomirskaya (born 1966), Ukrainian mathematician working on dynamical systems and mathematical physics
 Naomi Jochnowitz, American algebraic number theorist known for her mentorship of women in mathematics
 Aimee Johnson, American expert on dynamical systems
 Katherine Johnson (1918–2020), calculated the trajectory for Project Mercury and the 1969 Apollo 11 flight to the Moon
 Marion Lee Johnson, African-American mathematician, helped calculate trajectories for the Apollo 11 moon landing
 Antonia J. Jones (1943–2010), British mathematician and computer scientist
 Eleanor Jones (1929–2021), one of the first African American women to receive a PhD in mathematics
 Shelly M. Jones, American mathematics educator
 Nataša Jonoska (born 1961), Macedonian-American expert in DNA computing
 Artishia Wilkerson Jordan (1901–1974), African-American mathematics educator and clubwoman
 Nalini Joshi, researcher in differential equations, Australian Laureate Fellow, Hardy Lecturer, president of Australian Mathematical Society
 Josephine Jue, Chinese-American mathematician, compiler, and programmer, first Asian-American woman at NASA

K

 Margarethe Kahn (1880–c. 1942), one of the first female German doctorates, contributed to Hilbert's sixteenth problem
 Suzan Kahramaner (1913–2006), one of the first female mathematicians in Turkish academia
 Gabriele Kaiser, German mathematics educator
 Nataliya Kalashnykova, Soviet-Mexican expert on bilevel optimization
 Efstratia Kalfagianni, Greek-American topologist
 Eva Kallin, American researcher in geometric axiom systems, functional algebra, and polynomial convexity
 Gudrun Kalmbach (born 1937), German quantum logician
 Anne-Sophie Kaloghiros, French algebraic geometer
 Barbara Kaltenbacher, Austrian applied analyst, president of Austrian Mathematical Society
 Hermine Agavni Kalustyan (1914–1989), Armenian-Turkish mathematician and politician
 Constance Kamii, Swiss-Japanese-American mathematics education scholar and psychologist
 Shoshana Kamin (born 1930), Soviet-Israeli mathematical physicist, wrote about parabolic partial differential equations
 Mihyun Kang, South Korean graph theorist
 Chiu-Yen Kao (born 1974), Taiwanese-American expert in image processing and mathematical biology
 Gizem Karaali, Turkish representation theorist, founding editor of Journal of Humanistic Mathematics
 Mary Cordia Karl (1893–1984), American geometer
 Carol Karp (1926–1972), American researcher on infinitary logic, viola player
 Yael Karshon (born 1964), Israeli-Canadian expert on symplectic geometry
 Elaine Kasimatis, American discrete geometer and mathematics educator
 Haya Kaspi (born 1948), Israeli probability theorist
 Fanny Kassel (born 1984), French expert on Lie groups
 Svetlana Katok (born 1947), Russian-American founder of Electronic Research Announcements of the AMS
 Yoshie Katsurada (1911–1980), Japanese differential geometer, first Japanese woman with a doctorate or professorship in mathematics
 Bruria Kaufman (1918–2010), Israeli theoretical physicist who collaborated with Einstein on general relativity
 Kathleen Kavanagh, American mathematician, applies simulation-based engineering to water quality and sustainability
 Elham Kazemi (born 1970), Iranian-American mathematics educator
 Ailsa Keating, French-British symplectic geometer
 Rinat Kedem (born 1965), American mathematician and mathematical physicist
 Linda Keen (born 1940), American mathematician and computer scientist, president of AWM
 Lyudmila Keldysh (1904–1976), Russian set theorist and geometric topologist
 Ruth Kellerhals (born 1957), Swiss expert on hyperbolic geometry, geometric group theory and polylogarithm identities
 Julia Kempe, French, German, and Israeli researcher in quantum computing
 Claribel Kendall (1889–1965), one of the founders of the Rocky Mountain Section of the MAA
 Juliette Kennedy, mathematical logician in Finland
 Patricia Clark Kenschaft (born 1940), American mathematician, prolific book author, and activist for equity and diversity
 Autumn Kent, American mathematician specializing in topology and geometry, promoter of transgender rights
 Leah Keshet, Israeli-Canadian mathematical biologist, first female president of the Society for Mathematical Biology
 Radha Kessar, Indian mathematician known for her research in the representation theory of finite groups
 Barbara Keyfitz (born 1944), Canadian-American researcher on nonlinear partial differential equations, president of AWM and ICIAM
 Lily Khadjavi, American mathematician, author on mathematics for social justice
 'Mamphono Khaketla (born 1960), Lesotho mathematician, senator, and finance minister
 Olga Kharlampovich (born 1958), Russian-Canadian group theorist who solved the Tarski conjecture on first-order theories of free groups
 Carolyn Kieran, Canadian mathematics educator
 Anna Kiesenhofer (born 1991), Austrian cyclist and mathematical physicist
 Misha Kilmer, American applied mathematician known for research in numerical linear algebra and scientific computing
 Eun Jung Kim, South Korean researcher in parameterized complexity and graph width
 Ju-Lee Kim (born 1969), Korean-American expert on the representation theory of p-adic groups
 Chawne Kimber (born 1971), African-American mathematician and quilter, incorporates social justice into mathematics teaching
 Amy C. King (1928–2014), American mathematics educator
 Angie Turner King (1905–2004), American mathematics and chemistry educator
 Karen D. King (1971–2019), African-American mathematics educator and Falconer Lecturer
 L. Christine Kinsey, American topologist and textbook author
 Faina Mihajlovna Kirillova (born 1931), Belarusian optimal control theorist
 Vivien Kirk, New Zealand dynamical systems theorist, president of New Zealand Mathematical Society
 Ellen Kirkman, American algebraist
 Denise Kirschner, American mathematical biologist and immunologist
 Frances Kirwan (born 1959), British specialist in algebraic and symplectic geometry
 Virginia Kiryakova, Bulgarian mathematician, expert on fractional calculus and special functions
 Jane Kister, British-American mathematical logician, editor of Mathematical Reviews
 Tinne Hoff Kjeldsen, Danish researcher in mathematics education and the philosophy and history of mathematics
 Kathrin Klamroth (born 1968), German expert on combinatorial optimization and facility location
 Erica Klarreich (born 1972), American geometer and writer
 Maria Klawe (born 1951), Canadian-American theoretical computer scientist, president of Harvey Mudd College
 Caroline Klivans, American algebraic combinatorist, expert on chip-firing games
 Małgorzata Klimek (born 1957), Polish mathematician, expert on fractional calculus
 Genevieve M. Knight (1939–2021), African-American mathematics educator
 Julia F. Knight, American specialist in model theory and computability theory
 Eleanor Krawitz Kolchin (1927–2019), American mathematician, programmer, and astronomer, calculated orbits for the Apollo program
 Tamara G. Kolda, American applied mathematician at Sandia National Laboratories
 Natalia Komarova, Russian-American mathematician, studies cancer, language, gun control, pop music, and other complex systems
 Nancy Kopell (born 1942), American researcher in the dynamics of the nervous system
 Elaine Koppelman (1937–2019), American mathematician
 Maria Korovina (born 1962), Russian research on functional spaces and differential equations
 Yvette Kosmann-Schwarzbach (born 1941), French differential geometer, namesake of the Kosmann lift
 Ekaterina Kostina, Belarusian-German expert on nonlinear optimization
 Motoko Kotani (born 1960), Japanese discrete geometric analyst and academic administrator
 Sofya Kovalevskaya (1850–1891), first major Russian female mathematician, worked in analysis, differential equations and mechanics
 Bryna Kra (born 1966), American mathematician who applies dynamical systems in number theory and combinatorics
 Edna Kramer (1902–1984), American mathematician and author of mathematics books
 Gunilla Kreiss (born 1958), Swedish numerical analyst
 Cecilia Krieger (1894–1974), third person and first woman to earn a Canadian mathematics PhD, translator of Sierpiński
 Holly Krieger, American dynamical systems theorist
 Anna Zofia Krygowska (1904–1988), Polish mathematician known for her work in mathematics education
 Ewa Kubicka, Polish-American graph theorist and actuarial scientist
 Vera Kublanovskaya (1920–2012), Russian inventor of the QR algorithm for computing eigenvalues and eigenvectors
 Daniela Kühn (born 1973), German-English combinatorialist, expert on infinite graphs, winner of the Whitehead Prize
 Radhika Kulkarni, Indian-American operations researcher, president of INFORMS
 Angela Kunoth (born 1963), German numerical analyst
 Frances Kuo, Taiwanese-Australian applied mathematician, expert on quasi-Monte Carlo methods
 Krystyna Kuperberg (born 1944), Polish-American topologist who found a smooth counterexample to the Seifert conjecture
 Věra Kůrková (born 1948), Czech expert in neural networks and approximation theory
 Rachel Kuske (born 1965), American-Canadian expert on stochastic and nonlinear dynamics, asymptotic methods, and industrial mathematics
 Klavdija Kutnar (born 1980), Slovenian algebraic graph theorist and academic administrator
 Gitta Kutyniok (born 1972), German researcher in harmonic analysis, compressed sensing, and image processing

L

 Izabella Łaba (born 1966), Polish-Canadian specialist in harmonic analysis, geometric measure theory, and additive combinatorics
 Carole Lacampagne, American mathematician known for her work in mathematics education and gender equality
 Christine Ladd-Franklin (1847–1930), American psychologist, logician, and mathematician
 Jeanne LaDuke (born 1938), American child actress, mathematical analyst, and historian of mathematics
 Olga Ladyzhenskaya (1922–2004), Soviet mathematician, proved convergence of a finite difference method for Navier–Stokes
 V. Lakshmibai, Indian-American expert on flag varieties and Schubert varieties
 Matilde Lalín, Argentine-Canadian number theorist, expert on L-functions and Mahler measure
 Ailsa Land, British operations researcher known for developing branch and bound algorithms
 Susan Landau (born 1954), American mathematician and computer scientist, known for internet security and denesting radicals
 Mary Landers (1905–1991), American mathematician, activist for academic collective bargaining
 Kerry Landman, Australian applied mathematician
 Alicia Prieto Langarica, American applied mathematician
 Tanja Lange, German number theorist and cryptographer
 Amy Langville (born 1975), American college basketball star and expert on ranking systems
 Loredana Lanzani (born 1965), Italian-American harmonic analyst
 Glenda Lappan (born 1939), developed Connected Mathematics curriculum, led National Council of Teachers of Mathematics
 Gillie Larew (1882–1977), American mathematician, first alumna of Randolph–Macon Woman's College to become full professor there
 Jean Ann Larson, American set theorist and historian of mathematical logic
 Elisabeth Larsson (born 1971), Swedish researcher in scientific computing
 Irena Lasiecka (born 1948), Polish-American expert in control theory of partial differential equations
 Renu C. Laskar (born 1932), Indian-American graph theorist, specialist in domination numbers and circular arc graphs
 Klavdiya Latysheva (1897–1956), Soviet mathematician, contributed to differential equations, electrodynamics and probability
 Monique Laurent (born 1960), French-Dutch expert in mathematical optimization
 Kristin Lauter (born 1969), American researcher in elliptic curve cryptography, president of AWM
 Emille D. Lawrence, American topological graph theorist
 Ruth Lawrence (born 1971), child prodigy, British-Israeli researcher in knot theory and algebraic topology
 Snezana Lawrence, Yugoslav and British historian of mathematics
 Anneli Cahn Lax (1922–1999), American mathematician, winner of the George Pólya Award
 Anita Layton, Hong Kong-American applied mathematician who studies mathematical models of kidney function
 Katherine Puckett Layton, American mathematics educator and textbook author
 Lê Thị Thanh Nhàn (born 1970), Vietnamese mathematician, vice rector for Science at Thái Nguyên University, won Kovalevskaya Prize
 Alice Lee (1858–1939), helped discredit craniology
 Hollylynne Lee, American mathematics and statistics educator
 Joceline Lega, French applied mathematician interested in nonlinear dynamics
 Anne M. Leggett, American mathematical logician, editor of AWM Newsletter
 Emma Lehmer (1906–2007), Russian-American mathematician known for work on reciprocity laws in algebraic number theory
 Marguerite Lehr (1898–1987), pioneer in the use of television to teach mathematics
 Tanya Leise, American biomathematician, expert in circadian rhythms
 Joan Leitzel (born 1936), American mathematics educator and university administrator
 Miriam Leiva, Cuban-American mathematics educator
 Mary Leng, British philosopher of mathematics
 Frédérique Lenger (1921–2005), Belgian mathematics educator and leader of the New Math movement
 Suzanne Lenhart (born 1954), American researcher in partial differential equations, president of AWM
 Ulrike Leopold-Wildburger (born 1949), Austrian mathematical economist, applied mathematician, and operations researcher
 Katrin Leschke (born 1968), German differential geometer, quaternionic analyst, and minimal surface theorist
 Gail Letzter (born 1960), American quantum group representation theorist and intelligence agency executive
 Annie Leuch-Reineck (1880–1978), Swiss mathematician and women's rights activist
 Debbie Leung, Canadian expert in quantum communications
 Rachel Levy (born 1968), American applied mathematician, mathematics educator, and blogger
 Sophia Levy (1888–1963), American astronomer, numerical analyst, and mathematics educator
 Marta Lewicka (born 1972), Polish expert in nonlinear elasticity
 Florence Lewis (1877–1964), American mathematician and astronomer
 Marie Lhuissier (born 1989), French mathematical storyteller and children's book author
 Jing-Rebecca Li, applied mathematician in France, studies magnetic resonance imaging and Lyapunov equations
 Sherry Li, Chinese-American developer of sparse parallel solvers for systems of linear equations
 Winnie Li (born 1948), Chinese-American researcher in number theory, coding theory, automorphic forms, and spectral graph theory
 Paulette Libermann (1919–2007), French specialist in differential geometry
 Pamela Liebeck (1930–2012), British mathematician and mathematics educator
 Lillian Rosanoff Lieber (1886–1986), American mathematics professor and author of popular books on science and mathematics
 Magnhild Lien, Norwegian mathematician specializing in knot theory
 Elizaveta Litvinova (1845–c. 1919), Russian mathematician and biographer, defied czar's order forbidding women to study abroad
 Bonnie Litwiller (1937–2012), American mathematics educator and textbook author
 Marie Litzinger (1899–1952), American number theorist
 Chiu-Chu Melissa Liu (born 1974), Taiwanese-American researcher in algebraic geometry and symplectic geometry
 Klara Löbenstein (1883–1968), German researcher in algebraic geometry
 Patti Frazer Lock (born 1953), American mathematics and statistics educator and textbook author
 Deborah Frank Lockhart, administrator at the National Science Foundation
 Susan Loepp (born 1967), American algebraist and cryptographer
 Marina Logares (born 1976), Spanish geometer and LGBT+ activist
 Mayme Logsdon (1881–1967), American algebraic geometer and mathematics educator
 Louise Zung-nyi Loh (1900–1981), Chinese mathematician, physicist, and educator
 Sara Lombardo, Italian mathematician, expert on rogue waves and integrable systems
 Ling Long (mathematician), Chinese-American expert on modular forms, elliptic surfaces, and dessins d'enfants
 Lynette Long, American psychologist, mathematics educator, and textbook author
 Carlotta Longo (1895- after 1959), Italian mathematical physicist and high school teacher
 Judith Q. Longyear (1938–1995), American researcher in graph theory and combinatorics
 Maria Laura Moura Mouzinho Leite Lopes (1917–2013), first Brazilian woman to earn a doctorate in mathematics
 Paola Loreti, Italian researcher in Fourier analysis, control theory, and non-integer bases
 Lisa Lorentzen, Norwegian mathematician and author, specializing in continued fractions
 Dawn Lott, African-American expert on numerical partial differential equations
 Ada Lovelace (1815–1852), wrote the first computer program as part of her work on Babbage's Analytical Engine
 María Teresa Lozano Imízcoz (born 1946), Spanish low-dimensional topologist
 Sylvia Chin-Pi Lu (1928–2014), Chinese-American commutative algebraist
 Katarzyna Lubnauer (born 1969), Polish probability theorist and politician
 Edith Hirsch Luchins (1921–2002), Polish-American mathematician, experimented on psychology of mathematical problem solving
 Maria Silvia Lucido (1963–2008), Italian mathematician, expert on the prime graphs of finite groups
 Malwina Łuczak, Polish-Australian probability theorist
 Monika Ludwig (born 1966), Austrian researcher in convex geometry, member of Austrian Academy of Sciences
 Alessandra Lunardi (born 1958), Italian mathematical analyst
 Xiaoyu Luo, Chinese and British applied mathematician, applies fluid dynamics and biomechanics to soft tissues
 Élisabeth Lutz (1914–2008), French student of Weil, showed how to compute torsion subgroups of elliptic curves
 Julie Lutz (born 1944), American astronomer and mathematician who studies planetary nebulae and symbiotic binary stars
 Sonja Lyttkens (1919–2014), Swedish mathematician, first Swedish woman to obtain a permanent academic position in mathematics

M

 Odile Macchi (born 1943), French mathematician and physicist
 Marta Macho Stadler (born 1962), Basque expert on foliations and mathematical blogger
 Barbara MacCluer, American expert on operator theory and author on functional analysis
 Brenda MacGibbon, Canadian mathematician, statistician, and decision scientist
 Sheila Scott Macintyre (1910–1960), Scottish researcher on the Whittaker constant, co-author of German–English mathematics dictionary
 Annie MacKinnon (1868–1940), Canadian-born American mathematician, third woman to earn a mathematics doctorate at an American university
 Diane Maclagan (born 1974), expert on toric varieties, Hilbert schemes, and tropical geometry
 Chrystal Macmillan (1872–1937), Scottish Liberal politician, barrister, feminist and pacifist, first female honours graduate in mathematics from University of Edinburgh
 Jessie MacWilliams (1917–1990), English researcher on error-correcting codes
 Kathleen Madden, American expert on dynamical systems
 Isabel Maddison (1869–1950), British mathematician known for her work on differential equations
 Penelope Maddy (born 1950), American philosopher of mathematics
 Urmila Mahadev, American quantum computing researcher
 Dorothy Maharam (1917–2014), American mathematician who made important contributions to measure theory
 Carolyn A. Maher, American expert in mathematics education
 Carolyn Mahoney (born 1946), African-American combinatorialist, president of Lincoln University of Missouri
 Apala Majumdar, British expert on liquid crystals
 Larisa Maksimova (born 1943), Russian mathematical logician
 Agnieszka Malinowska, Polish expert on fractional calculus and the calculus of variations
 Maryanthe Malliaris, American mathematician specializing in model theory
 Vivienne Malone-Mayes (1932–1995), fifth African-American woman to earn a PhD in mathematics, researcher in functional analysis
 Eugenia Malinnikova (born 1974), Russian-Norwegian expert in functional analysis and partial differential equations
 Claudia Malvenuto (born 1965), Italian mathematician known for her work on the Hopf algebra of permutations
 Cristina Manolache, British algebraic geometer
 Michelle Manes, American mathematician interested in number theory, algebraic geometry, and dynamical systems
 Kathryn Mann, geometric topologist and geometric group theorist
 Renata Mansini (born 1968), Italian applied mathematician, uses mathematical optimization for portfolio balancing
 Elizabeth Mansfield, Australian expert on moving frames and conservation laws
 Lisa Mantini, American mathematician
 María Manzano (born 1950), Spanish mathematical logician
 Elena Marchisotto (born 1945), American mathematician, mathematics educator, and historian of mathematics
 Anna Marciniak-Czochra (born 1974), Polish applied mathematician and mathematical biologist
 Matilde Marcolli (born 1969), Italian mathematical physicist
 Fotini Markopoulou-Kalamara (born 1971), Greek theoretical physicist interested in foundational mathematics and quantum mechanics
 Hannah Markwig (born 1980), German researcher in tropical geometry
 Alison Marr (born 1980), American graph theorist and advocate of inquiry-based learning
 Karen Marrongelle, American mathematics educator and academic administrator
 Bethany Rose Marsh, British expert in cluster algebras and tilting theory
 Susan H. Marshall, American number theorist
 Maia Martcheva, Bulgarian-American mathematical biologist
 Laura Martignon (born 1952), Colombian-Italian researcher in neuroscience and decision-making
 Emilie Martin (1869–1936), American group theorist
 Mireille Martin-Deschamps, French algebraic geometer, president of Société mathématique de France
 Consuelo Martínez (born 1955), Spanish algebraist
 María del Carmen Martínez Sancho (1901–1995), first woman in Spain to gain a PhD in Mathematics
 Verónica Martínez de la Vega (born 1971), Mexican hypertopologist
 Katalin Marton (1941–2019), Hungarian information and probability theorist
 Susan Martonosi, American mathematician, applies operations research to counter-terrorism, epidemiology, and sports analytics
 Roswitha März (born 1940), German expert on differential-algebraic equations
 Verdiana Masanja (born 1954), first Tanzanian woman to earn a doctorate in mathematics
 Joanna Masingila (born 1960), American mathematics educator
 Vera Nikolaevna Maslennikova (1926–2000), Russian researcher on partial differential equations, hydrodynamics of rotating fluids, and function spaces
 Maura Mast, Irish-American differential geometer, mathematics educator, textbook author, and academic administrator
 Claire Mathieu (born 1965), French algorithms researcher
 Gordana Matic, Croatian-American low-dimensional topologist, expert on contact topology
 Kaisa Matomäki (born 1985), Finnish number theorist known for her work on multiplicative functions over short intervals
 Gretchen Matthews (born 1973), American algebraic coding theorist
 Laura Matusevich, Argentine commutative algebraist
 Galina Matvievskaya (born 1930), Soviet-Russian historian of mathematics
 Margaret Maxfield (1926–2016), American mathematician and mathematics book author
 Lola J. May (1923–2007), American mathematics educator and early proponent of new math
 Svitlana Mayboroda (born 1981), Ukrainian-American expert on boundary value problems for elliptic partial differential equations
 Ellen Maycock (born 1950), American functional analyst and mathematics educator
 Anna Mazzucato, American expert on fluid dynamics
 Shirley McBay (1935–2021), first African-American doctorate at the University of Georgia
 Mary McCammon ( – 2008), first woman to complete a doctoral degree in mathematics at Imperial College London
 Maeve McCarthy, Irish mathematician interested in inverse problems and biological modeling
 Lynne McClure, British mathematics educator
 Dorothy McCoy (1903–2001), American mathematician, first female doctorate in mathematics at University of Iowa
 Janet McDonald (1905–2006), American geometer
 Dusa McDuff FRS (born 1945), English researcher on symplectic geometry, winner of Satter Prize, first female Hardy Lecturer
 Elizabeth McHarg (1923–1999), Scottish mathematician and translator, first female president of Edinburgh Mathematical Society
 Lois Curfman McInnes, American researcher on numerical solution of nonlinear partial differential equations for scientific applications
 Camille McKayle (born 1964), Afro-Jamaican-American mathematician and academic administrator
 Danica McKellar (born 1975), American actor, author, mathematician, and education advocate
 Joyce McLaughlin (1939–2017), American researcher in inverse problems
 Jeanette McLeod, New Zealand combinatorialist, popularizes mathematics through crochet and origami
 Jennifer McLoud-Mann, Cherokee mathematician who discovered the 15th and last class of convex pentagons that tile the plane
 Jenny McNulty, American matroid theorist and academic administrator
 Florence Marie Mears (1896–1995), American specialist in summation methods
 Catherine Meadows, American cryptographer who formally verifies cryptographic protocols
 Elizabeth Meckes (1980–2020), American probability theorist
 Nicole Megow, German discrete mathematician and theoretical computer scientist, researcher in scheduling algorithms
 Ulrike Meier Yang, German-American expert on numerical algorithms for scientific computing
 Beatrice Meini (born 1968), Italian computational mathematician and numerical analyst
 Sylvie Méléard, French probability theorist
 Pauline Mellon, Irish functional analyst, president of Irish Mathematical Society
 Karin Melnick, American differential geometer
 Teresa Melo (born 1966), Portuguese mathematician and operations researcher
 Florence Merlevède, French probability theorist
 Helen Abbot Merrill (1864–1949), American mathematician, educator and textbook author
 Winifred Edgerton Merrill (1862–1951), first woman with a degree from Columbia University and first American female doctorate in mathematics
 Adele Merritt, American applied mathematician and intelligence officer
 Uta Merzbach (1933–2017), German-American historian of mathematics, first Smithsonian curator of mathematical instruments
 Vilma Mesa, Colombian-American mathematics educator
 Chikako Mese, American differential geometer
 Jill P. Mesirov, American mathematician, computer scientist, and computational biologist, president of AWM
 Jaqueline Mesquita (born 1985), Brazilian mathematician specializing in differential equations
 Dora Metcalf (1892–1982), British mathematician and data analysis entrepreneur
 Ida Martha Metcalf (1857–1952), second American female doctorate in mathematics
 Catherine Meusburger (born 1978), German mathematical physicist interested in string theory
 Ariane Mézard, French arithmetic geometer
 Marie-Louise Michelsohn (born 1941), American researcher on complex geometry, spin manifolds, the Dirac operator, and algebraic cycles
 Ruth I. Michler (1967–2000), American commutative algebraist and algebraic geometer
 Kaisa Miettinen (born 1965), Finnish industrial optimization researcher and academic administrator
 Alison Miller, first American female gold medalist in the International Mathematical Olympiad, three-time Elizabeth Lowell Putnam award winner
 Laura Miller, American mathematician, applies fluid dynamics to insect flight and jellyfish propulsion
 Maggie Miller, American low-dimensional topologist
 Mirka Miller (1949–2016), Czech-Australian graph theorist, data security expert
 Margaret Millington (1944–1973), English expert on modular forms
 Eva Miranda, Spanish expert on symplectic dynamics
 Rosa M. Miró-Roig (born 1960), Spanish algebraic geometer and commutative algebraist
 Maryam Mirzakhani (1977–2017), first female Fields medalist; researcher on the symmetry of curved surfaces
 Yuliya Mishura, Ukrainian probability theorist and mathematical finance expert
 Josephine M. Mitchell (1912–2000), Canadian-American mathematical analyst, victim of discriminative application of anti-nepotism rules
 Dorina Mitrea (born 1965), Romanian-American functional analyst and mathematics educator
 Irina Mitrea, Romanian-American researcher in partial differential equations known for outreach to women and minorities
 Atsuko Miyaji (born 1965), Japanese cryptographer and number theorist
 Reiko Miyaoka (born 1951), Japanese geometer known for her research on hypersurfaces
 Fatma Moalla (born 1939), first Tunisian woman to earn a French doctorate in mathematics
 Colette Moeglin (born 1953), French expert on automorphic forms
 Joanne Moldenhauer (1928–2016), American high school mathematics teacher
 Amanda Montejano, Mexican graph theorist, expert in coloring geometric graphs
 Clemency Montelle (born 1977), New Zealand historian of Indian mathematics and astronomy
 Susan Montgomery (born 1943), American researcher in noncommutative algebra
 Helen Moore, American mathematician who applies control theory to combination therapy in the health industry
 Cathleen Synge Morawetz (1923–2017), Canadian-American researcher on the partial differential equations governing fluid flow
 Anne C. Morel, American logician, order theorist, and algebraist, first female full professor of mathematics at the University of Washington
 Sophie Morel (born 1979), French number theorist and contributor to the Langlands program, first female tenured mathematics professor at Harvard
 Eugenie Maria Morenus (1881–1966), American mathematician and professor
 Susan Morey, American mathematician specializing in commutative algebra
 Hélène Morlon (born 1978), French mathematical biologist, models biodiversity
 Irene Moroz, British applied mathematician
 Joy Morris (born 1970), Canadian researcher on groups and graphs
 Kirsten Morris (born 1960), Canadian control theorist
 Rosa M. Morris (1914–2011), Welsh applied mathematician and aerodynamicist
 Jennifer Morse, American algebraic combinatorialist
 Rose Morton (1925–1999), American expert in the mathematical modeling of bubbles
 Joan Moschovakis, American intuitionistic logician
 Ruth Moufang (1905–1977), German researcher on non-associative algebraic structures, namesake of Moufang loops
 Magdalena Mouján (1926–2005), Argentine mathematician of Basque descent, operations researcher, computing pioneer, and science fiction author
 Nežka Mramor–Kosta, Slovenian mathematician
 Jennifer Mueller, American applied mathematician, expert in inverse problems and electrical impedance tomography
 Edith Alice Müller (1918–1995), Swiss mathematician and astronomer, studied the group theory of Moorish tile designs
 Anna Mullikin (1893–1975), American mathematician, early investigator of point set theory
 Irene Mulvey, American mathematician, president of American Association of University Professors
 Anca Muscholl (born 1967), Romanian-German mathematical logician and theoretical computer scientist
 Kieka Mynhardt (born 1953), South African and Canadian expert on dominating sets in graph theory
 Emmy Murphy, American symplectic geometer
 Cecilia Wangechi Mwathi (1963–2011), Kenyan mathematician and union activist, first woman in Kenya to become a mathematics professor
 Valerie Myerscough (1942–1980), British mathematician and astrophysicist
 Vera Myller (1880–1970), Russian mathematician and student of David Hilbert, first female professor in Romania
 Wendy Myrvold, Canadian graph theorist, combinatorist, and algorithms researcher

N

 Anna Nagurney, Ukrainian-American mathematician, economist, educator and author in operations management
 Hasibun Naher, Pakistani applied mathematician who studies tsunamis
 Andrea R. Nahmod (born 1964), American expert in nonlinear Fourier analysis, harmonic analysis, and partial differential equations
 Pia Nalli (1884–1964), Italian researcher in functional analysis and tensor calculus
 Seema Nanda, Indian researcher in applications of mathematics to biology, engineering and finance
 Mangala Narlikar, Indian number theorist, author of Marathi-language mathematics books for schoolchildren
 Sonia Natale (born 1972), Argentine expert in abstract algebra
 Caryn Navy (born 1953), blind American researcher in set-theoretic topology and Braille technology
 Lyudmyla Nazarova, Ukrainian representation theorist
 Vicky Neale, British number theorist and mathematics popularizer
 Gabriele Nebe (born 1967), German researcher on sphere packings, lattices, and codes
 Deanna Needell, American applied mathematician, won 2016 IMA Prize in Mathematics and Applications
 Sara Negri (born 1967), Italian-Finnish proof theorist
 Evelyn Nelson (1943–1987), Canadian researcher in universal algebra with applications to theoretical computer science
 Gail S. Nelson (born 1959), American mathematician, textbook author, and editor-in-chief of the MAA "Problem Books"
 Nancy Neudauer, American matroid theorist known for her work in mathematical outreach in Africa and South America
 Claudia Neuhauser (born 1962), German-American mathematical biologist whose research concerns spatial ecology
 Hanna Neumann (1914–1971), German-born mathematician who worked on group theory
 Adriana Neumann de Oliveira, Brazilian expert in interacting particle systems
 Mara Neusel (1964–2014), German-American invariant theorist and advocate for women in mathematics
 Monica Nevins (born 1973), Canadian algebraist
 Virginia Newell (born 1917), American mathematics educator, author, politician, and centenarian
 Mary Frances Winston Newson (1869–1959), first female American to receive a PhD in mathematics from a European university
 Sylvia de Neymet (1939–2013), First Mexican woman to earn a doctorate in mathematics in Mexico
 Purity Ngina, Kenyan biomathematician
 Giang Nguyen (born 1985), Vietnamese-Australian applied mathematician and chess master
 Aoibhinn Ní Shúilleabháin (born 1983), Irish celebrity and mathematics lecturer
 Nancy K. Nichols, British applied mathematician and numerical analyst
 Olympia Nicodemi, American mathematician and mathematics educator interested in wavelets and the history of mathematics
 Phyllis Nicolson (1917–1968), British developer of the Crank–Nicolson method for solving partial differential equations
 Barbara Niethammer (born 1963), German expert on the growth of particles in liquids
 Stanisława Nikodym (1897–1988), first Polish woman to earn PhD in mathematics, known for research in continuum theory
 Mila Nikolova (1962–2018), Bulgarian researcher in image processing, inverse problems, and compressed sensing
 Kumiko Nishioka (born 1954), Japanese specialist on transcendental numbers and Mahler functions
 Wiesława Nizioł, Polish researcher in arithmetic algebraic geometry
 Emmy Noether (1882–1935), German researcher in abstract algebra and theoretical physics, named "the greatest woman mathematician of all time"
 Margarita Nolasco Santiago, Mathematics textbook author, member of Puerto Rico Senate
 Khalida Inayat Noor, Pakistani mathematical analyst
 Dorothée Normand-Cyrot, French control theorist
 Isabella Novik (born 1971), Israeli-American expert on algebraic and geometric combinatorics
 Frieda Nugel (1884–1966), one of the first German women to obtain a doctorate in mathematics
 Helena J. Nussenzveig Lopes, Brazilian mathematician known for her research on incompressible Euler equations
 Kaisa Nyberg (born 1948), Finnish cryptographer

O
 Katharine Elizabeth O'Brien (1901–1986), American mathematician, musician and poet
 Vivian O'Brien (1924–2010), American applied mathematician and physicist, expert in fluid dynamics and visual perception
 Hilary Ockendon, British applied mathematician, expert in fluid dynamics
 Ortrud Oellermann, South African and Canadian graph theorist
 Yoshiko Ogata, Japanese quantum mathematical physicist
 Frédérique Oggier, Swiss and Singaporean coding theorist
 Hee Oh (born 1969), Korean-American dynamical systems theorist, expert on equidistribution in fractal structures
 Eve Oja (1948–2019), Estonian functional analyst
 Christine O'Keefe, Australian researcher in finite geometry and information security
 Kathleen Adebola Okikiolu (born 1965), British-American researcher on differential operators, developed curricula for inner-city children
 Dianne P. O'Leary (born 1951), American expert on scientific computing, computational linear algebra, and the history of scientific computing
 Janis Oldham (1956–2021), African-American differential geometer and mathematics educator
 Olga Oleinik (1925–2001), Soviet researcher on partial differential equations, elastic media, and boundary layers
 Dorte Olesen (born 1948), first Danish mathematician to be appointed full professor
 Gloria Olive (1923–2006), American-born New Zealand mathematician
 Déborah Oliveros, Mexican discrete and convex geometer
 Kathleen Ollerenshaw (1912–2014), British mathematician and politician, mayor of Manchester, educational advisor to Margaret Thatcher
 Yewande Olubummo (born 1960), Nigerian-American functional analyst
 Rebecca Walo Omana (born 1951), first female mathematics professor in the Democratic Republic of the Congo
 Cathy O'Neil, American arithmetic algebraic geometer and author on the social hazards of machine learning
 Eugenia O'Reilly-Regueiro, Mexican algebraic combinatorist
 Rosa Orellana, American mathematician specializing in algebraic combinatorics and representation theory
 Ewa Orłowska (born 1935), Polish logician
 Omayra Ortega, American mathematical epidemiologist
 Laura Ortíz-Bobadilla, Mexican expert on holomorphic foliations
 Hinke Osinga (born 1969), Dutch expert in dynamical systems, crocheted the Lorenz manifold
 Barbara L. Osofsky (born 1937), American algebraist, first woman in 50 years to address a national AMS meeting, first female AMS journal editor
 Mina Ossiander, American probability theorist
 Sofiya Ostrovska (born 1958), Ukrainian probability theorist and approximation theorist
 Marie Françoise Ouedraogo (born 1967), Burkinabé expert on pseudodifferential operators and superalgebras, president of African Women in Mathematics Association
 Helen Brewster Owens (1881–1968), American suffragette, associate editor of the American Mathematical Monthly
 Robyn Owens, Australian applied mathematician, studies computer vision including face recognition and the imaging of lactation

P

 Ietje Paalman-de Miranda (1936–2020), Surinamese–Dutch mathematician, first female mathematics professor at University of Amsterdam
 Harriet Padberg (1922–2014), mathematician, music therapist, and pioneer of algorithmic music composition
 Mariolina Padula (died 2012), Italian expert on fluid dynamics
 Christina Pagel, British German operations researcher, applies data analysis and mathematical modelling to health care
 Eleanor Pairman (1896–1973), Scottish mathematician, developed methods to teach mathematics to blind students
 Ilona Palásti (1924–1991), Hungarian researcher in discrete geometry, geometric probability, and random graphs
 Pandrosion (4th century AD), ancient Greek mathematician predating Hypatia, developed an approximation for cube roots
 Erika Pannwitz (1904–1975), German geometric topologist who proved that every knot has a quadrisecant
 Anna Panorska, Polish-American expert on extreme events in stochastic processes and on the effect of weather on baseball
 Greta Panova (born 1983), Bulgarian-American algebraic combinatorist
 Theoni Pappas (born 1944), American mathematics teacher and author of books on popular mathematics
 Raman Parimala (born 1948), Indian mathematician known for her contributions to algebra
 Clare Parnell (born 1970), British astrophysicist and applied mathematician, studies the mathematics of the sun and of magnetic fields
 Haesun Park, Korean-American researcher in numerical analysis and the data sciences
 Jinyoung Park, South Korean combinatorist
 Karen Parshall (born 1955), American historian of mathematics
 Bozenna Pasik-Duncan, Polish-American control theorist and mathematics educator
 Maria Pastori (1895–1975), Italian mathematician, specialist in rational mechanics
 Christine Paulin-Mohring (born 1962), French mathematical logician and computer scientist, developer of Coq theorem prover
 Barbara Paulson (born 1928), American human computer at NASA's Jet Propulsion Laboratory
 Nataša Pavlović, Serbian–American expert in fluid dynamics and nonlinear dispersive equations
 Sylvie Paycha (born 1960), French mathematician working in operator theory
 Sandrine Péché (born 1977), French expert on random matrices
 Jean Pedersen (1934–2016), American mathematician and author, expert on mathematical paper folding
 Irena Peeva, American researcher in commutative algebra and its applications
 Jeanne Peiffer (born 1948), Luxembourgian historian of mathematics
 Magda Peligrad, Romanian probability theorist known for her work on stochastic processes
 Beatrice Pelloni (born 1962), Italian expert on partial differential equations
 Rose Peltesohn (1913–1998), German-Israeli researcher in additive combinatorics
 Kirsi Peltonen, Finnish mathematician whose interests include differential geometry and the connections between mathematics and art
Charlotte Elvira Pengra (1875–1916), sixth American woman to receive a doctorate in mathematics
 Cristina Pereyra (born 1964), Venezuelan mathematician, author of several books on wavelets and harmonic analysis
 Teri Perl (born 1926), American mathematics educator, educational software designer, and author
 Bernadette Perrin-Riou (born 1955), French number theorist, winner of the Ruth Lyttle Satter Prize
 Mary Perry Smith (1926–2015), American mathematics educator, founder of MESA program for under-privileged students
 Hazel Perfect (died 2015), British combinatorialist, author, and translator, inventor of gammoids
 Laura Person, American low-dimensional topologist
 Ilaria Perugia (born 1969), Italian applied mathematician and numerical analyst
 Adriana Pesci, Argentine fluid dynamicist, expert on flagellar motion, soap films, and the Leidenfrost effect
 Małgorzata Peszyńska (born 1962), Polish-American applied mathematician, models geological flow in porous media
 Rózsa Péter (1905–1977), recursion theorist, first woman elected to the Hungarian Academy of Sciences
 Stefanie Petermichl (born 1971), German-French mathematical analyst, first female winner of the Salem Prize
 Louise Petrén-Overton (1880–1977), first Swedish woman with a doctorate in mathematics
 Guergana Petrova, Bulgarian applied mathematician, uses numerical methods to solve differential equations
 Sonja Petrović, American mathematical statistician
 Linda Petzold (born 1954), researcher in differential algebraic equations and simulation, member of National Academy of Engineering
 Julia Pevtsova, Russian-American representation theorist
 Mamokgethi Phakeng (born 1966), first black female South African to earn a PhD in mathematics education
 Flora Philip (1865–1943), first female member of the Edinburgh Mathematical Society
 Cynthia A. Phillips, American expert on combinatorial optimization
 Dominique Picard (born 1953), French expert on the statistical applications of wavelets
 Sophie Piccard (1904–1990), Russian-Swiss mathematician, first female full professor in Switzerland
 Lisa Piccirillo, American low-dimensional topologist
 Ragni Piene (born 1947), Norwegian algebraic geometer, member of the Norwegian Academy of Science and Letters
 Lillian Pierce, American mathematician whose research connects number theory with harmonic analysis
 Johanna Piesch (1898–1992), Austrian pioneer in switching algebra
 Marie Anne Victoire Pigeon (1724–1767), French mathematician, writer, and teacher
 Faustina Pignatelli (d. 1785), princess of Colubrano, second woman elected to the Academy of Sciences of Bologna
 Gabriella Pinzari, Italian expert on the -body problem
 Jill Pipher (born 1955), researcher in harmonic analysis, Fourier analysis, differential equations, and cryptography, president of AWM
 Laura Pisati (died 1908), Italian mathematician, first woman invited to speak at International Congress of Mathematicians 
 Elena Cornaro Piscopia (1646–1684), Italian philosopher, musician, and mathematics lecturer, first woman to earn a doctorate
 Toniann Pitassi, American-Canadian computational complexity theorist, expert on proof complexity
 Tina Pizzardo (1903 – 1989), Italian mathematics teacher and anti-fascist
 Shirley Pledger, New Zealand mathematician and statistician known for her work on mark and recapture methods
 Vera Pless (1931–2020), American mathematician specializing in combinatorics and coding theory
 Kim Plofker (born 1964), American historian of Indian mathematics, winner of the Brouwer Medal
 Gerlind Plonka, German mathematician known for her work on refinable functions and curvelets
 Eileen Poiani, American mathematician, first woman to teach mathematics at Saint Peter's University, first female president of Pi Mu Epsilon
 Claudia Polini, Italian expert on commutative algebra
 Harriet Pollatsek (born 1942), Lie theorist who has applied difference sets to error correcting codes and coding theory
 Pelageya Polubarinova-Kochina (1899–1999), Soviet researcher in fluid mechanics, hydrodynamics, and history of mathematics
 Elena Moldovan Popoviciu (1924–2009), Romanian functional analyst
 Freda Porter (born 1957), American applied mathematician, groundwater consultant, and Native American leader
 Yvonne Pothier (born 1937), Canadian mathematics educator, Catholic nun, and activist for refugees
 Marian Pour-El (1928–2009), American mathematical logician and computable analyst
 Victoria Powers, American real algebraic geometer and social choice theorist
 Maria Assunta Pozio (died 2018), Italian expert on partial differential equations
 Cheryl Praeger (born 1948), Australian researcher in group theory, algebraic graph theory and combinatorial designs
 Malabika Pramanik, Indian-Canadian harmonic analyst
 Eleanor C. Pressly (1918–2003), American mathematician and sounding rocket engineer
 Emma Previato (born 1952), researcher in algebraic geometry and partial differential equations
 Candice Renee Price, American mathematician, advocate for greater representation of women and people of color in STEM
 Rachel Justine Pries, American arithmetic geometer and Galois theorist
 Hilary Priestley, British mathematician who used topological methods to study distributive lattices
 Christine Proust (born 1953), French expert on Babylonian mathematics
 Mileva Prvanović (1929–2016), Serbian differential geometer, first to earn a doctorate in geometry in Serbia
 Mary Pugh, American-Canadian expert on thin films
 Amber L. Puha, American probability theorist
 Jessica Purcell, American and Australian low-dimensional topologist
 Florence Purington (1862–1950), first dean of Mount Holyoke College
 Ulla Pursiheimo (born 1944), Finnish control theorist who became the first female mathematics professor in Finland
 Helena Pycior (born 1947), American historian of mathematics and expert on Marie Curie and human-animal relations

Q
 Martine Queffélec (born 1949), French expert in substitution dynamical systems and Diophantine approximation
 Jennifer Quinn, American combinatorialist
 Peregrina Quintela Estévez (born 1960), Spanish applied mathematician

R

 Ami Radunskaya, American mathematician, specializes in dynamical systems and applications to medical problems, president of AWM
 Virginia Ragsdale (1870–1945), American specialist in algebraic curves, formulated the Ragsdale conjecture
 Alison Ramage, British expert in preconditioning methods for numerical linear algebra
 Kavita Ramanan, Indian-American probability theorist
 Mythily Ramaswamy (born 1954), Indian functional analyst and control theorist
 Susan Miller Rambo (1883–1977), second woman awarded a PhD from the University of Michigan, delegate to 1928 ICM
 Sujatha Ramdorai (born 1962), Indian-Canadian algebraic number theorist, expert on Iwasawa theory
 Saly Ruth Ramler (1894–1993), first woman to earn a mathematics doctorate from Charles University
 Jacqui Ramagge, Australian mathematician and academic administrator, president of Australian Mathematical Society
 Asha Rao, Indian-Australian mathematician and expert in cybersecurity
 Annie Raoult (born 1951), French applied mathematician, models cell membranes and other thin nanostructures
 Helena Rasiowa (1917–1994), Polish researcher in the foundations of mathematics and algebraic logic
 Marina Ratner (1938–2017), Russian-American ergodic theorist, member of National Academy of Sciences
 Cora Ratto de Sadosky (1912–1981), Argentine mathematician and human rights activist
 Geneviève Raugel (1951–2019), French numerical analyst and dynamical systems theorist
 Ethel Raybould (1899–1987), Australian mathematician and mathematics benefactor
 Michèle Raynaud (born 1938), French algebraic geometer
 Margaret Rayner (1929–2019), British expert on isoperimetric inequalities, president of Mathematical Association
 Michela Redivo-Zaglia, Italian numerical analyst
 Mary Lynn Reed (born 1967), American mathematician, intelligence researcher, and short fiction writer
 Mary Rees (born 1953), British specialist in complex dynamical systems
 Mina Rees (1902–1997), first female President of the American Association for the Advancement of Science
 Sarah Rees (born 1957), British group theorist
 Karin Reich (born 1941), German historian of mathematics and biographer of mathematicians
 Anna Barbara Reinhart (1730–1796), Swiss mathematician, wrote commentary on Newton's Principia
 Kristina Reiss (born 1952), German mathematics educator
 Idun Reiten (born 1942), Norwegian representation theorist, member of the Norwegian Academy of Science and Letters
 Yuriko Renardy, Australian-American expert in fluid dynamics
 Rosemary Renaut, British and American computational mathematician
 Barbara Reys (born 1953), American mathematics educator known for her research in number sense and mental calculation
 Karen Rhea, American calculus educator and proponent of flipped classrooms
 Ida Rhodes (1900–1986), American pioneer in computer programming, designed the first computer used for Social Security
 Pilar Ribeiro (1911–2011), Portuguese mathematician, founded Portuguese Mathematical Society and Gazeta de Matemática
 Marjorie Rice (1923–2017), American amateur mathematician who discovered new pentagon tilings
 Joan L. Richards (born 1948), American historian of mathematics
 Mary Rickett (1861–1925), British mathematician and educator
 Cicely Ridley (1927–2008), British-American applied mathematician, developed codes for quantum chemistry and climate models
 Christine Riedtmann (born 1952), Swiss algebraist, president of Swiss Mathematical Society
 Eleanor Rieffel (born 1965), American applied mathematician interested in quantum computing, computer vision, and cryptography
 Carol Jane Anger Rieke (1908–1999), American astronomer and mathematics educator
 Beatrice Rivière (born 1974), French expert on numerical simulation of fluid flow through porous media
 Catherine A. Roberts (born 1965), American applied mathematician and executive director of the American Mathematical Society
 Rachel Roberts, American low-dimensional topologist
 Siobhan Roberts, Canadian mathematical biographer
 Vanessa Robins, Australian computational topologist
 Julia Robinson (1919–1985), American researcher on diophantine equations, contributed to solution of Hilbert's Tenth Problem
 Margaret M. Robinson, American number theorist and expert on zeta functions
 Alvany Rocha, American specialist in Lie groups, computed characters of the Virasoro algebra
 Eliane R. Rodrigues, Brazilian-Mexican researcher on stochastic models for pollution and health
 Jana Rodriguez Hertz (born 1970), Argentine and Uruguayan mathematician
 Rosana Rodríguez-López, Spanish expert on the application of fixed-point theorems to differential equations
 Rubí Rodríguez, Chilean complex geometer, president of Chilean Mathematical Society
 Sylvie Roelly (born 1960), French probability theorist
 Alice Rogers, English expert on supermanifolds
 Marie Rognes (born 1982), Norwegian researcher in scientific computing and numerical methods
 Judith Roitman (born 1945), American specialist in set theory, topology, Boolean algebra, and mathematics education
 Anna Romanowska, Polish abstract algebraist, first convenor of European Women in Mathematics
 Dolores Romero Morales (born 1971), Spanish operations researcher
 Colva Roney-Dougal, British computational group theorist
 Anna Rönström (1847–1920), Swedish educator, school founder, and mathematician
 Marian P. Roque, Filipina expert on partial differential equations, president of the Mathematical Society of the Philippines
 Frances A. Rosamond (born 1943), Australian researcher in parameterized complexity, advocate for women in computer science and mathematics
 Margit Rösler, German expert on harmonic analysis, special functions, and Dunkl operators
 Mary G. Ross (1908–2008), first Native American female engineer, studied mathematics for aeronautics and celestial mechanics
 Alida Rossander (1843–1909) and Jenny Rossander (1837–1887), Swedish mathematics teachers and women's rights activists
 Corinna Rossi (born 1968), Italian Egyptologist and historian of Egyptian mathematics and architecture
 Alice Roth (1905–1977), Swiss mathematician known for her invention of Swiss cheese spaces
 Hildegard Rothe-Ille (1899–1942), German mathematician specializing in Ramsey theory
 Linda Preiss Rothschild (born 1945), president of AWM, vice-president of AMS, co-editor-in-chief of Mathematical Research Letters
 Christel Rotthaus, German-American researcher in commutative algebra
 Svetlana Roudenko, Russian-American functional analyst
 Christiane Rousseau (born 1954), French-Canadian mathematician, president of the Canadian Mathematical Society
 Marie-Françoise Roy (born 1950), French expert in real algebraic geometry, co-founder of two organizations for women in mathematics
 Julia Rozanska, Soviet topologist
 Maria Aparecida Soares Ruas (born 1948), Brazilian singularity theorist
 Jean E. Rubin (1926–2002), American expert on the axiom of choice
 Mary Ellen Rudin (1924–2013), constructed many counterexamples in topology
 Adela Ruiz de Royo (1943–2019), first lady of Panama
 Mari-Jo P. Ruiz, Filipina graph theorist and operations researcher
 Iris Runge (1888–1966), German applied mathematician, translator and biographer
 Mary Beth Ruskai (born 1944), proved subadditivity of quantum entropy, bounded the electrons in an atom, advocate for women in mathematics
 Beulah Russell (1878–1940), American mathematician
 Barbara Falkenbach Ryan, American mathematician, computer scientist, statistician and business executive

S
 Irene Sabadini, Italian hypercomplex analyst
 Flora Sadler (1912–2000), Scottish mathematician and astronomer
 Cora Sadosky (1940–2010), Argentine-American analyst, president of the Association for Women in Mathematics
 Claudia Sagastizábal, Argentine-Brazilian researcher in convex optimization and energy management
 Ayşe Şahin, Turkish-American expert on dynamical systems
 Laure Saint-Raymond (born 1975), French specialist in partial differential equations, member of the French Academy of Sciences
 Reiko Sakamoto (born 1939), Japanese expert in hyperbolic boundary value problems
 Graciela Salicrup (1935–1982), Mexican pioneer in categorical topology
 Judith D. Sally (born 1937), American researcher in commutative algebra, Noether lecturer
 Sema Salur, Turkish-American differential geometer
 Jean E. Sammet (1928–2017), supervised the first scientific programming group, helped develop COBOL
 Mildred Sanderson (1889–1914), American mathematician, established a correspondence between modular and formal invariants
 Marta Sanz-Solé (born 1952), Catalan researcher on stochastic processes, president of the European Mathematical Society
 Winifred Sargent (1905–1979), English researcher on integration theory and BK-spaces
 Ruth Lyttle Satter (1923–1989), American researcher on circadian rhythms, namesake of Ruth Lyttle Satter Prize in Mathematics
 Linda Gilbert Saucier (born 1948), American mathematician, prolific textbook author
 Lisa Sauermann (born 1992), German mathematician ranked third in the International Mathematical Olympiad Hall of Fame
 Bonita V. Saunders, American expert on mathematical visualization
 Carla Savage, American researcher on parallel algorithms and combinatorial generation, secretary of AMS
 Cami Sawyer, American and New Zealand expert on distance learning in mathematics
 Karen Saxe, American expert on functional analysis and social choice theory
 Jacquelien Scherpen, Dutch nonlinear control theorist
 Carol Schumacher (born 1960), Bolivian-born American mathematician, author of inquiry-based learning textbooks
 Jane Cronin Scanlon (1922–2018), American researcher in partial differential equations and mathematical biology
 Alice T. Schafer (1915–2009), American differential geometer, founding member of the Association for Women in Mathematics
 Sakura Schafer-Nameki, German mathematical physicist
 Mary Schaps (born 1948), Israeli mathematician and academic administrator, researcher in deformation theory, group theory, and representation theory
 Doris Schattschneider (born 1939), American mathematician known for writing about tessellations and the art of M. C. Escher
 Michelle Schatzman (1949–2010), French numerical analyst
 Katya Scheinberg, Russian-American expert on derivative-free continuous optimization
 Anne Schilling, American algebraic combinatorialist, representation theorist, and mathematical physicist
 Tamar Schlick, American applied mathematician who develops and applies tools for biomolecule modeling and simulation
 Karin Schnass (born 1980), Austrian expert on sparse dictionary learning
 Leila Schneps (born 1961), American-French analytic number theorist and arithmetic geometer, archivist of Grothendieck's works
 Anita Schöbel (born 1969), German operations researcher, expert on optimization for public transportation
 Maria E. Schonbek (born 1979), Argentine-American researcher in fluid dynamics and associated partial differential equations
 Carola-Bibiane Schönlieb (born 1979), Austrian mathematician known for her research in image analysis
 Lynn Schreyer, American applied mathematician, models porous media
 Mary Leontius Schulte (1901–2000), American nun, mathematics educator, and historian of mathematics
 Jennifer Schultens (born 1965), American low-dimensional topologist and knot theorist
 Marie-Hélène Schwartz (1913–2013), French mathematician known for her work on characteristic numbers of spaces with singularities
 Irene Sciriha, Maltese graph theorist
 Jeanette Scissum, American mathematician known for her work on sunspot prediction
 Charlotte Scott (1858–1931), British mathematician who promoted mathematical education of American women
 Jennifer Scott (born 1960), British numerical analyst
 Catherine Searle, American differential geometer
 Ruthmae Sears, Bahamian-American mathematics educator
 Jennifer Seberry (born 1944), Australian cryptographer, mathematician, and computer scientist, one of the founders of Asiacrypt
 Rose Whelan Sedgewick (c. 1904–2000), first person to earn a PhD in mathematics from Brown University
 Esther Seiden (1908–2014), Polish-Israeli-American mathematical statistician known for her research on design of experiments and combinatorial design
 Anna Seigal, British applied algebraic geometer
 Annie Selden, American mathematics educator, one of the founders of the Association for Women in Mathematics
 Svetlana Selezneva (born 1963), Russian expert on discrete functions
 Helaine Selin (born 1946), American librarian, historian of science, and ethnomathematician
 Muriel Seltman (1927–2019), British left-wing activist, mathematics educator, historian of mathematics, and author
 Marjorie Senechal (born 1939), American expert on quasicrystals, author on history of science, editor-in-chief of The Mathematical Intelligencer
 Adélia Sequeira, Portuguese applied mathematician specializing in modeling blood flow
 Sylvia Serfaty (born 1975), French expert on superconductivity, winner of the European Mathematical Society Prize
 Vera Serganova, Russian-American researcher on superalgebras and their representations
 Caroline Series (born 1951), English specialist in hyperbolic geometry, Kleinian groups and dynamical systems
 Lily Serna (born 1986), Israeli-Australian arithmetical guru of the SBS game show Letters and Numbers
 Cristina Sernadas (born 1951), Portuguese mathematical logician
 Brigitte Servatius (born 1954), Austrian-American expert on matroids and structural rigidity
 Nataša Šešum, expert in geometric flows
 Jeanette Shakalli (born 1985), promoter of mathematics in Panama
 Betty Shannon (1922–2017), mathematician and human computer, collaborator with husband Claude Shannon
 Zorya Shapiro (1914–2013), Soviet mathematician, educator and translator
 Tatyana Shaposhnikova (born 1946), Russian-Swedish researcher on multipliers in function spaces, partial differential operators, and history of mathematics
 Mei-Chi Shaw (born 1955), Taiwanese-American researcher on partial differential equations
 Mariya Shcherbina (born 1958), Ukrainian expert on random matrices
 Amy Shell-Gellasch, American historian of mathematics and book author
 Diana Shelstad (born 1947), Australian-American mathematician, formulated the fundamental lemma of the Langlands Program
 Wenxian Shen, Chinese-American dynamical systems theorist
 Irina Shevtsova (born 1983), Russian probability theorist
 Brooke Shipley, American expert in homotopy theory and homological algebra
 Rebecca Shipley, British applied mathematician and healthcare engineer
 Tatiana Shubin, Soviet-American mathematician, founder of several mathematics circles
 Patricia D. Shure, American mathematics educator and calculus reformer
 Lesley Sibner (1934–2013), American differential geometer and Hodge theorist, produced a constructive proof of the Riemann–Roch theorem
 Martha Siegel, American probability theorist and mathematics educator
 Anna Sierpińska (born 1947), Polish-Canadian scholar of understanding and epistemology in mathematics education
 Mary Silber, American expert in bifurcation theory and pattern formation
 Alice Silverberg (born 1958), American number theorist and cryptographer
 Ruth Silverman (c. 1936–2011), American computational geometer, founder of Association for Women in Mathematics
 Evelyn Silvia (1948–2006), American functional analyst and mathematics educator
 Rodica Simion (1955–2000), Romanian-American pioneer in the study of permutation patterns
 Valeria Simoncini (born 1966), Italian numerical analyst
 Lao Genevra Simons (1870–1949), American mathematician and historian of mathematics
 Hourya Benis Sinaceur (born 1940), Moroccan expert in the theory and history of mathematics
 Mary Emily Sinclair (1878–1955), American mathematician, first woman to earn a doctorate in mathematics at the University of Chicago
 Nathalie Sinclair (born 1970), Canadian researcher in mathematics education
 Stephanie Singer, American mathematician and politician, author of books on symmetry
 Sue Singer, British mathematics educator, president of Girls' Schools Association and Mathematical Association
 Ajit Iqbal Singh  (born 1943), Indian researcher in functional analysis and harmonic analysis
 Sylvia Skan (1897–1972), British applied mathematician known for the Falkner–Skan boundary layer in fluid mechanics
 Jessica Sklar (born 1973), American mathematician interested in abstract algebra, recreational mathematics, and the popularization of mathematics
 Anna Skripka, Ukrainian-American noncommutative analyst
 Gillian Slater, British mathematician and academic administrator, vice chancellor of Bournemouth University
 Lucy Joan Slater (1922–2008), British expert on hypergeometric functions and the Rogers–Ramanujan identities
 Angela Slavova, Bulgarian expert on waves and cellular neural networks, chair of SIAM
 Alice Slotsky, American historian of mathematics and Assyriologist
 Marian Small (born 1948), Canadian proponent of constructivist mathematical instruction
 Ionica Smeets (born 1979), Dutch number theorist and science communicator
 Deirdre Smeltzer (born 1964), American mathematician, mathematics educator, academic administrator, and textbook author
 Sonja Smets, Belgian and Dutch mathematical logician, works on quantum logic and belief revision
 Adelaide Smith (1878–1938), American mathematician, studied and taught internationally
 Clara Eliza Smith (1865–1943), American mathematician specializing in complex analysis
 Daphne L. Smith, first African-American woman to earn a Ph.D. in mathematics at the Massachusetts Institute for Technology
 Karen E. Smith (born 1965), American specialist in commutative algebra and algebraic geometry
 Kate Smith-Miles, Australian applied mathematician, president of Australian Mathematical Society
 Leslie M. Smith (born 1961), American applied mathematician and engineering physicist working in turbulence
 Martha K. Smith, American mathematics educator and non-commutative algebraist
 Agata Smoktunowicz (born 1973), Polish-Scottish researcher in abstract algebra, constructed noncommutative nil rings
 Nina Snaith (born 1974), British researcher in random matrix theory, quantum chaos, and zeta functions
 Vera Šnajder (1904–1976), Bosnian mathematician, first Bosnian to publish in mathematics, first female dean in Yugoslavia
 Priyanshi Somani (born 1998), Indian mental calculator
 Mary Somerville (1780–1872), Scottish science writer and polymath, one of two first female members of the Royal Astronomical Society
 Christina Sormani, American researcher on Riemannian geometry, metric geometry, and Ricci curvature
 Vera T. Sós (born 1930), Hungarian number theorist and combinatorialist
 Chris Soteros, Canadian applied mathematician, studies biomolecules and the knot theory of random space curves
 Marilda Sotomayor (born 1944), Brazilian mathematician, economist, and game theorist
 Laila Soueif (born 1956), Egyptian mathematics professor and women's rights activist
 Diane Souvaine (born 1954), American computational geometer, advocate for women and minorities in mathematics and gender neutrality in teaching
 Hortensia Soto, Mexican-American mathematics educator
 Ayşe Soysal (born 1948), Turkish mathematician, president of Boğaziçi University
 Angela Spalsbury (born 1967), American functional analyst and academic administrator
 Birgit Speh (born 1949), American expert in Lie groups, namesake of Speh representations
 Domina Eberle Spencer (1920–2022), researcher on electrodynamics and field theory, founded fringe science organization Natural Philosophy Alliance
 M. Grazia Speranza, Italian operations researcher, president of EURO and IFORS
 Pauline Sperry (1885–1967), mathematician, musician, and astronomer, unconstitutionally fired from UC Berkeley for refusing to sign a loyalty oath
 Dolores Richard Spikes (1936–2015), African-American mathematician, first female university chancellor and first female president of a university system in the US
 Nicole Spillane (born 1988), French and Irish applied mathematician
 Vera W. de Spinadel (1929–2017), Argentine-Austrian researcher on metallic means
 Jean Springer (1939–2007), Jamaican-Canadian specialist in abstract algebra and academic administrator
 Jane Squire (bap. 1686 – 1743), English mathematician studied solutions to finding longitude at sea
 Bhama Srinivasan (born 1935), representation theorist, president of the Association for Women in Mathematics
 Hema Srinivasan (born 1959), Indian-American mathematician specializing in abstract algebra and algebraic geometry
 Kaye Stacey (born 1948), Australian mathematics educator
 Tanja Stadler (born 1981), German mathematician, expert in phylogenetics
 Gigliola Staffilani (born 1966), Italian-American researcher on harmonic analysis and partial differential equations
 Anna Stafford (1905–2004), one of the first postdoctoral researchers at the Institute for Advanced Study
 Helene Stähelin (1891–1970), Swiss mathematician, editor of Bernoulli family letters, and pacifist
 Gwyneth Stallard, British expert on complex dynamics and the iteration of meromorphic functions
 Katherine E. Stange, Canadian-American number theorist
 Zvezdelina Stankova (born 1969), Bulgarian-American expert on permutation patterns, founder of the Berkeley Math Circle
 Nancy K. Stanton, American researcher on complex analysis, partial differential equations, and differential geometry
 Marion Elizabeth Stark (1894—1982), one of the first female American mathematicians to receive a doctorate
 Anastasia Stavrova, Russian expert in algebraic groups, non-associative algebra, and algebraic K-theory
 Jackie Stedall (1950–2014), British historian of mathematics
 Angelika Steger (born 1962), German-Swiss expert on graph theory, randomized algorithms, and approximation algorithms
 Irene Stegun (1919–2008), American mathematician who edited a classic book of mathematical tables
 Gabriele Steidl (born 1963), German researcher in computational harmonic analysis, convex optimization, and image processing
 Mary Kay Stein, American mathematics educator
 Berit Stensønes (born 1956), Norwegian mathematician specializing in complex analysis and complex dynamics
 Elizabeth Stephansen (1872–1961), first Norwegian woman to receive a mathematics doctorate
 Edith Stern (born 1952), child prodigy in mathematics and IBM engineer
 Chris Stevens, American topological group theorist, historian of mathematics, and mathematics educator
 Perdita Stevens (born 1966), British algebraist, theoretical computer scientist, and software engineer
 Lorna Stewart, Canadian graph theorist and graph algorithms researcher
 Alice Christine Stickland (1906–1987), British applied mathematician, expert on radio propagation
 Angeline Stickney (1830–1892), American suffragist, abolitionist, and mathematician, namesake of the largest crater on Phobos
 Doris Stockton (1924–2018), American mathematician and textbook author
 Ruth Stokes (1890–1968), American mathematician, astronomer, and cryptologer, pioneer of linear programming, and founder of Pi Mu Epsilon journal
 Yvonne Stokes, Australian expert on fluid mechanics, mathematical biology, and industrial applications of mathematics
 Emily Stone, American mathematician, works in fluid mechanics and dynamical systems
 Betsy Stovall, American harmonic analyst
 Anita Straker, British mathematics educator, president of the Mathematical Association
 Dona Strauss (born 1934), British mathematician, founder of pointless topology and European Women in Mathematics
 Anne Penfold Street (1932–2016), Australian combinatorialist, third woman mathematics professor in Australia
 Ileana Streinu, Romanian-American computational geometer, expert on kinematics and structural rigidity
 Catharina Stroppel (born 1971), German researcher on representation theory, low-dimensional topology, and category theory
 Marilyn Strutchens (born 1962), African-American mathematics educator
 Tatjana Stykel, Russian-German expert on numerical linear algebra, control theory, and differential-algebraic equations
 Dorothy Geneva Styles (1922–1984), American organist, choir director, composer, poet, and mathematician
 Bella Subbotovskaya (1938–1982), Soviet founder of the Jewish People's University
 Indulata Sukla (born 1944), Indian researcher on Fourier series, author of textbook on number theory and cryptography
 Agnès Sulem (born 1959), French applied mathematician, control theorist, and mathematical finance expert
 Catherine Sulem (born 1957), Algerian-born Canadian mathematician and violinist, expert on singularities in wave propagation
 Nike Sun, American probability theorist studying phase transitions and counting complexity
 Iryna Sushko (born 1967), Ukrainian mathematician, applies nonlinear dynamical systems to economics
 Rosamund Sutherland (1947–2019), British mathematics educator
 Louise Nixon Sutton (1925–2006), first African-American woman to earn a mathematics PhD at New York University
 Thyrsa Frazier Svager (1930–1999), African-American mathematician, donated entire salary to support African-American women in mathematics
 Márta Svéd (–2005), Hungarian-Australian mathematician, wrote about non-Euclidean geometry
 Marcia P. Sward (1939–2008), executive director of the Mathematical Association of America
 Lorna Swain (1891–1936), British fluid dynamics researcher, early female lecturer at Cambridge
 Irena Swanson, Yugoslav-born American commutative algebraist and mathematical quilter
 Henda Swart (1939–2016), South African geometer and graph theorist, editor-in-chief of Utilitas Mathematica
 Jennifer Switkes, American mathematics educator and volunteer prison mathematics instructor
 Polly Sy, Filipino functional analyst
 Ágnes Szendrei, Hungarian-American expert on universal algebra
 Esther Szekeres (1910–2005), Hungarian-Australian mathematician posed the happy ending problem in discrete geometry
 Wanda Szmielew (1918–1976), Polish logician who proved the decidability of the first-order theory of abelian groups
 Zofia Szmydt (1923–2010), Polish researcher on differential equations, potential theory and distributions

T

 Laura Taalman, American mathematician known for work on the mathematics of Sudoku and mathematical 3D printing
 Daina Taimiņa (born 1954), Latvian-American mathematician, crochets objects to illustrate hyperbolic space
 Martha Takane, Mexican algebraist and algebraic combinatorist
 Christiane Tammer, German expert in set-valued optimization
 Tan Lei (1963–2016), Chinese-French specialist in complex dynamics and functions of complex numbers
 Betül Tanbay (born 1960), first female president of the Turkish Mathematical Society
 Yunqing Tang, Chinese-American number theorist and arithmetic geometer
 Rosalind Tanner (1900–1992), English mathematician and a historian of mathematics
 Anne Taormina, Belgian mathematical physicist interested in string theory, moonshine, and the symmetry of virus capsids
 Gabriella Tarantello (born 1958), Italian mathematician specializing in partial differential equations, differential geometry, and gauge theory
 Éva Tardos (born 1957), Hungarian-American researcher in combinatorial optimization algorithms
 Olga Taussky-Todd (1906–1995), Austrian and later Czech-American advocate of matrix theory
 Jean Taylor (born 1944), American mathematician known for her work on soap bubbles and crystals
 Aretha Teckentrup, British mathematician, data scientist, and numerical analyst
 Mina Teicher, Israeli algebraic geometer
 Monique Teillaud, French computational geometer
 Montserrat Teixidor i Bigas, Spanish-American expert on moduli of vector bundles on curves
 Keti Tenenblat (born 1944), Turkish-Brazilian differential geometer
 Katrin Tent (born 1963), German mathematician, expert in group theory, the symmetries of groups, algebraic model theory, and finite geometry
 M. B. W. Tent, American mathematics educator, mathematical biographer
 Chuu-Lian Terng (born 1949), Taiwanese-American differential geometer
 Susanna Terracini (born 1963), Italian mathematician known for her research on chaos in Hamiltonian dynamical systems
 Audrey Terras (born 1942), American number theorist specializing in quantum chaos and zeta functions
 Susanne Teschl (born 1971), Austrian expert on mathematical modeling of breath analysis
 Donna Testerman (born 1960), expert in the representation theory of algebraic groups
 Ngamta Thamwattana, Thai-Australian expert in granular materials and nanotechnology
 Theano (6th century BC), one or possibly two different Pythagorean philosophers
 Diana Thomas, American mathematician who studies nutrition and body weight
 Doreen Thomas, South African and Australian mathematician and engineer 
 Janet Thomas, founder of the Australian Mathematical Sciences Institute
 Rekha R. Thomas, American mathematician and operations researcher
 Abigail Thompson (born 1958), American low-dimensional topologist, educational reformer
 Frances McBroom Thompson (1942–2014), American mathematics educator and textbook author
 Gillian Thornley (born 1940), New Zealand differential geometer, first woman president of the New Zealand Mathematical Society
 Heidi Thornquist, American applied mathematician, expert on numerical linear algebra and circuit simulation
 Mary Domitilla Thuener (1880–1977), American mathematician, founder of Thomas More College, Kentucky
 Ene-Margit Tiit (born 1934), Estonian mathematician and statistician, founding president of Estonian Statistical Society
 Mary Tiles (born 1946), writer on the philosophy and history of set theory
 Ulrike Tillmann FRS (born 1962), German-English algebraic topologist
 Sheila Tinney (1918–2010), Irish mathematical physicist, first Irishwoman with a mathematical doctorate
 Maryanne Tipler, New Zealand mathematics textbook author
 Françoise Tisseur, French-English numerical analyst
 Jacqueline Naze Tjøtta (1935–2017), French-Norwegian researcher in kinetics, magnetohydrodynamics and theoretical acoustics
 Renate Tobies (born 1947), German historian of mathematics
 Gordana Todorov (born 1949), American representation theorist and noncommutative algebraist
 Susan Tolman, American symplectic geometer
 Nicole Tomczak-Jaegermann FRSC, Polish-Canadian geometric functional analyst
 Alison Tomlin, British physical chemist and applied mathematician, develops detailed models of combustion
 Cristina Toninelli, Italian probability theorist
 Christina Tønnesen-Friedman, Danish-American Riemannian geometer
 Virginia Torczon, American applied mathematician, computer scientist, and expert in nonlinear optimization
 Antoinette Tordesillas, Australian applied mathematician
 Marie Torhorst (1888–1989), German mathematician, school teacher, and politician
 Anna-Karin Tornberg, Swedish computational mathematician
 Eve Torrence (born 1963), American mathematician, president of Pi Mu Epsilon
 Laura Toti Rigatelli (born 1941), Italian historian of mathematics and biographer of Galois
 Paula Tretkoff, Australian-American researcher in number theory, noncommutative geometry, and hypergeometric functions
 Christiane Tretter (born 1964), German expert in spectral theory and differential operators
 Věra Trnková (1934–2018) Czech category theorist
 Konstantina Trivisa, Greek-American expert in fluid dynamics and flocking
 Mary Esther Trueblood (1872–1939), American mathematician, studied with Felix Klein
 Chrysoula Tsogka, Greek applied mathematician, expert in wave propagation through complex media
 Olga Tsuberbiller (1885–1975), Russian analytical geometer and textbook author
 Virginia Tucker (1909–1985), American human computer at the National Advisory Committee for Aeronautics
 Laurette Tuckerman (born 1956), American and French researcher in computational fluid dynamics
 Annita Tuller (1910–1994), American geometer and textbook author
 Reidun Twarock, German-born mathematical biologist
 Julianna Tymoczko (born 1975), American algebraic geometer and algebraic combinatorist
 Regina Tyshkevich (1929–2019), Belarusian graph theorist, co-invented split graphs
 Galina Tyurina (1938–1970), Soviet algebraic geometer

U

 Olabisi Ugbebor (born 1951), first female mathematics professor in Nigeria
 Karen Uhlenbeck (born 1942), American mathematician, MacArthur Fellow, National Medal of Science, Leroy P. Steele Prize, Abel Prize
 Corinna Ulcigrai (born 1980), Italian researcher on dynamical systems, won European Mathematical Society Prize and Whitehead Prize
 Kristin Umland, American mathematics educator
 Nina Uraltseva (born 1935), Russian mathematical physicist, specialist in nonlinear partial differential equations
 Arantza Urkaregi (born 1954), Spanish mathematician and Basque separatist and feminist politician

V
 Brigitte Vallée (born 1950), French mathematician and computer scientist, expert in lattice basis reduction algorithms
 Clàudia Valls, Spanish and Portuguese mathematician specializing in dynamical systems
 Pauline van den Driessche (born 1941), British-Canadian pioneer in combinatorial matrix theory and mathematical biology
 Monica VanDieren, American model theorist and academic administrator
 Olena Vaneeva (born 1982), Ukrainian mathematician specializing in group analysis of differential equations
 Michela Varagnolo, Italian-French representation theorist
 Maria Eulália Vares, Brazilian expert in stochastic processes
 Dorothy Vaughan (1910–2008), African-American mathematician at NASA
 Elena Vázquez Cendón, Spanish expert in modeling waves and shallow water, and numerical solution of hyperbolic problems
 Mariel Vázquez, Mexican mathematical biologist specializing in DNA topology
 Eva Vedel Jensen (born 1951), Danish spatial statistician, stereologist, and stochastic geometer
 Argelia Velez-Rodriguez (born 1936), Black Cuban-American differential geometer
 Tatyana Velikanova (1932–2002), Soviet mathematician, computer programmer, dissident, and political prisoner
 Luitgard Veraart, German financial mathematician
 Michèle Vergne (born 1943), French specialist in analysis and representation theory, member of French Academy of Sciences
 Siobhán Vernon (1932–2002), first Irish-born woman to get a PhD in pure mathematics in Ireland
 Luminița Vese, Romanian specialist in image processing
 Katalin Vesztergombi (born 1948), Hungarian graph theorist and discrete geometer
 Maryna Viazovska (born 1984), Ukrainian mathematician, solved the sphere packing problems in dimensions 8 and 24
 Eva Viehmann (born 1980), German arithmetic geometer
 Marie-France Vignéras (born 1946), French mathematician who proved that one cannot hear the shape of a hyperbolic drum
 Maria Cristina Villalobos, American applied mathematician recognized for her mentorship
 Bianca Viray, American arithmetic geometer
 Nina Virchenko (born 1930), Ukrainian mathematician and anti-Soviet activist
 Monica Vișan (born 1979), Romanian expert on the nonlinear Schrödinger equation
 Marie A. Vitulli, American algebraic geometer, union organizer, and proponent for women in mathematics on Wikipedia
 Roxana Vivian (1871–1961), first female mathematics doctorate from the University of Pennsylvania
 Karen Vogtmann (born 1949), American geometric group theorist, namesake of Culler–Vogtmann outer space
 Margit Voigt, German expert on graph coloring
 Claire Voisin  (born 1962), French expert on Hodge structures and mirror symmetry, member of French Academy of Sciences
 Elisabeth Vreede (1879–1943), Dutch mathematician, astronomer and Anthroposophist
 Kristina Vušković (born 1967), Serbian graph theorist

W

 Michelle L. Wachs, American specialist in algebraic combinatorics
 Aissa Wade (born 1967), Senegalese symplectic geometer, president of African Institute for Mathematical Sciences
 Grace Wahba (born 1934), American pioneer in methods for smoothing noisy data
 Nathalie Wahl (born 1976), Belgian topologist
 Yoshiko Wakabayashi (born 1950), Brazilian researcher in combinatorial optimization and polyhedral combinatorics
 Rebecca Waldecker (born 1979), German group theorist
 Irène Waldspurger, French mathematician, expert on phase retrieval
 Carol Walker (born 1935), American group theorist and fuzzy set theorist
 Erica N. Walker, American mathematician, studies racial and gender equity in mathematics education
 Muriel Kennett Wales (1913–2009), Irish-Canadian mathematician
 Judy L. Walker, American algebraic coding theorist
 Mary Shore Walker (1882–1952), American mathematician, first woman faculty member at the University of Missouri
 Dorothy Wallace, American number theorist, mathematical biologist, and mathematics educator
 Lynne H. Walling, British number theorist
 Joan E. Walsh (1932–2017), British numerical analyst
 Marion Walter (1928–2021), German-born mathematician who wrote about using mirrors to explore symmetry
 Andrea Walther (born 1970), German expert in automatic differentiation
 Chelsea Walton (born 1983), African-American researcher in noncommutative algebra
 Yusu Wang, Chinese computational geometer and computational topologist
 Wang Zhenyi (1768–1797), Qing dynasty mathematician and astronomer
 Lesley Ward, Australian harmonic and complex analyst
 Rachel Ward, American applied mathematician who researches machine learning and signal processing
 Virginia Warfield, American mathematics educator
 Mary Wynne Warner (1932–1998), British pioneer in fuzzy topology
 Simone Warzel (born 1973), German mathematical physicist, expert on the many-body problem
 Talitha Washington (born 1974), American applied mathematician and mathematics educator
 Sarah L. Waters, British expert in fluid mechanics and tissue engineering
 Ann E. Watkins, American statistics educator, president of Mathematical Association of America
 Anne Watson, British mathematics educator
 Charlotte Watts (born 1962), British mathematical epidemiologist
 Johanna Weber (1910–2014), German-British mathematician and aerodynamicist, contributed to supersonic aircraft design
 Charlotte Wedell (1862–1953), one of four women at the first International Congress of Mathematicians
 Suzanne Weekes, American mathematician, cofounder of the Mathematical Sciences Research Institute Undergraduate Program
 Katrin Wehrheim (born 1974), American symplectic topologist and gauge theorist
 Guofang Wei (born 1965), Chinese-American differential geometer, found new positively-curved manifolds
 Tilla Weinstein (1934–2002), American differential geometer
 Marie Johanna Weiss (1903–1952), American mathematics researcher and textbook author 
 Katrin Wendland (born 1970), German mathematical physicist, expert on singularities in quantum field theories
 Annette Werner (born 1966), German expert on diophantine geometry and non-Archimedean algebraic geometry
 Elisabeth M. Werner, researcher on convex geometry, functional analysis, and probability theory
 Eléna Wexler-Kreindler (1931–2002), Romanian-French algebraist
 Anna Johnson Pell Wheeler (1883–1966), American researcher on infinite-dimensional linear algebra
 Mary Wheeler (born 1931), American expert on domain decomposition methods for partial differential equations
 Sue Whitesides, Canadian mathematician and computer scientist, expert in computational geometry and graph drawing
 Alice S. Whittemore, American group theorist, biostatistician, and epidemiologist who studies the effects of genetics and lifestyle on cancer
 Kirsten Wickelgren, American number theorist and geometer
 Margaret Wiecek, Polish-American operations researcher, expert on multi-objective optimization
 Sylvia Wiegand (born 1945), American algebraist, president of the Association for Women in Mathematics
 Anna Wienhard (born 1977), German differential geometer
 Lynda Wiest, American mathematics education researcher
 Marie S. Wilcox (died 1995), American high school mathematics teacher, textbook author, and president of National Council of Teachers of Mathematics
 Trena Wilkerson, American mathematics educator, president of National Council of Teachers of Mathematics
 Amie Wilkinson (born 1968), American researcher in ergodic theory and smooth dynamical systems
 Emily Willbanks (1930–2007), American mathematician who contributed to defense weapons applications and high performance storage
 Margaret Willerding (1919–2003), American mathematician and textbook author
 Karen Willcox, New Zealand applied mathematician, expert on reduced-order modeling and multi-fidelity methods
 Elizabeth Williams (1895–1986), British mathematician and educationist
 Emily Coddington Williams (1873–1952), American historian of mathematics, translator, novelist, playwright, and biographer
 Kim Williams, scholar of connections between mathematics and architecture
 Lauren Williams, American expert on cluster algebras and tropical geometry
 Roselyn E. Williams, American mathematician, founder of National Math Alliance
 Ruth J. Williams, American probability theorist, president of Institute of Mathematical Statistics
 Ruth Margaret Williams (born 1945), British mathematical physicist, researches discrete gravity
 Sheila Oates Williams (born 1939), British and Australian abstract algebraist
 Talithia Williams, American statistician and mathematician who researches the spatiotemporal structure of data
 Virginia Vassilevska Williams, Bulgarian-American researcher on graph algorithms and fast matrix multiplication
 Stephanie van Willigenburg, Canadian researcher in algebraic combinatorics and quasisymmetric functions
 Elizabeth Wilmer, American expert on Markov chain mixing times
 Helen Wilson (mathematician) (born 1973), British expert on non-Newtonian fluids, president of British Society of Rheology
 Ulrica Wilson, African-American mathematician specializing in noncommutative rings and the combinatorics of matrices
 Helen Wily (1921–2009), New Zealand mathematician and statistician
 Sarah Witherspoon, American mathematician interested in abstract algebra
 Emily E. Witt, American commutative algebraist and representation theorist
 Barbara Wohlmuth, German expert on the numerical solution of partial differential equations
 Julia Wolf, British mathematician specialising in arithmetic combinatorics
 Gail Wolkowicz, Canadian mathematical biologist known for her work on the competitive exclusion principle
 Maria Wonenburger (1927–2014), Galician-American group theorist, first Spanish Fulbright scholar in mathematics
 Carol Wood (born 1945), American expert in model-theoretic algebra, president of American Women in Mathematics
 Melanie Wood (born 1981), first female American to compete in the International Mathematical Olympiad
 Ruth Goulding Wood (1875–1935), American non-Euclidean geometer
 Sarah Woodhead (1851–1912), first woman to pass the Cambridge University mathematical Tripos examination
 Mary Lee Woods (1924–2017), British mathematician and computer programmer
 Carol S. Woodward, American expert in numerical algorithms and software
 Margaret H. Wright (born 1944), American researcher in optimization, linear algebra, and scientific computing
 Dorothy Maud Wrinch (1894–1976), Argentine-English mathematician and biochemical theorist, expert in protein structure
 Jang-Mei Wu, Taiwanese-American complex analyst
 Sijue Wu (born 1964), Chinese-American expert in the mathematics of water waves
 Emily Kathryn Wyant (1897–1942), American mathematician, founder of honor society Kappa Mu Epsilon
 Lucy R. Wyatt, British mathematician and oceanographer, studies high frequency radar oceanography and ocean surface waves
 Urszula Wybraniec-Skardowska (born 1940), Polish logician
 Cynthia Wyels, American mathematician known for her mentorship of Latino students

X
 Dianna Xu, American mathematician and computer scientist who studies computational problems on curves and surfaces

Y
 Carolyn Yackel, American commutative algebraist and mathematical fiber artist
 Erna Beth Yackel (1939–2022), American mathematics educator
 Catherine Yan, Chinese-American mathematician interested in algebraic combinatorics
 Grace Yang, Chinese-American expert on stochastic processes in the physical sciences, asymptotic theory, and survival analysis
 Elena Yanovskaya (born 1938), Soviet and Russian game theorist
 Sofya Yanovskaya (1896–1966), restored mathematical logic research in Soviet Union, edited mathematical works of Karl Marx
 Jane Ye, Chinese-Canadian researcher in variational analysis
 Karen Yeats (born 1980), Canadian mathematician whose research connects combinatorics to quantum field theory
 Florence Yeldham (1877–1945), British school teacher and historian of arithmetic
 Yiqun Lisa Yin, Chinese-American cryptographer, broke the SHA-1 hash scheme and helped develop the RC6 block cipher
 Ruriko Yoshida, Japanese-American combinatorist, statistician, phylogeneticist, and operations researcher
Anna Irwin Young (1873–1920), charter member of the Mathematical Association of America
 Lai-Sang Young (born 1952), Hong Kong born dynamical systems theorist
 Mabel Minerva Young (1872–1963), American geometer
 Virginia R. Young, American expert on the mathematics of insurance
 Noriko Yui, Japanese-Canadian researcher on arithmetic geometry, mathematical physics, and mirror symmetry
 Mariette Yvinec, French computational geometer

Z
 Sara Zahedi (born 1981), Iranian-Swedish researcher in computational fluid dynamics, former child refugee, and winner of EMS Prize
 Martina Zähle (born 1950), German stochastic geometer and geometric measure theorist
 Frieda Zames (1932–2005), American mathematician and disability rights activist
 Antonella Zanna, Italian-Norwegian numerical analyst
 Thaleia Zariphopoulou (born 1962), Greek-American expert in mathematical finance
 Claudia Zaslavsky (1917–2006), American mathematics educator and ethnomathematician
 Anna Zdunik, Polish researcher on dynamical systems
 Mary Lou Zeeman, British expert on dynamical systems and their application to mathematical biology
 Sarah Zerbes (born 1978), German and British algebraic number theorist
 Ping Zhang, graph theorist and textbook author
 Rozetta Zhilina (1933–2003), Soviet expert in computational problems for nuclear weapons
 Tamar Ziegler (born 1971), Israeli researcher in ergodic theory and arithmetic combinatorics, won Erdős Prize
 Magdolna Zimányi (1934–2016), pioneer of Hungarian computing

See also

 Association for Women in Mathematics
 European Women in Mathematics
 List of female scientists
 List of women in statistics
 Noether Lecturer
 Timeline of women in mathematics in the United States
 Timeline of women in mathematics worldwide
 Women in computing
 Women in science

References

External links
 Chronological Index of Women Mathematicians
 Alphabetical Index of Women Mathematicians
 List of Noether Lecturers
 Famous Female Mathematicians
 MacTutor index of female mathematicians
 Mathematical Women in the British Isles, 1878–1940 (Davis Archive)
 Biographies of Women Mathematicians on the Women in Math Project
  Biographies available in the Supplementary Material at AMS

 
 
Women
Mathematicians
Mathematicians
Mathematicians